= Neptune's Navy =

Ships operated by the Sea Shepherd Conservation Society

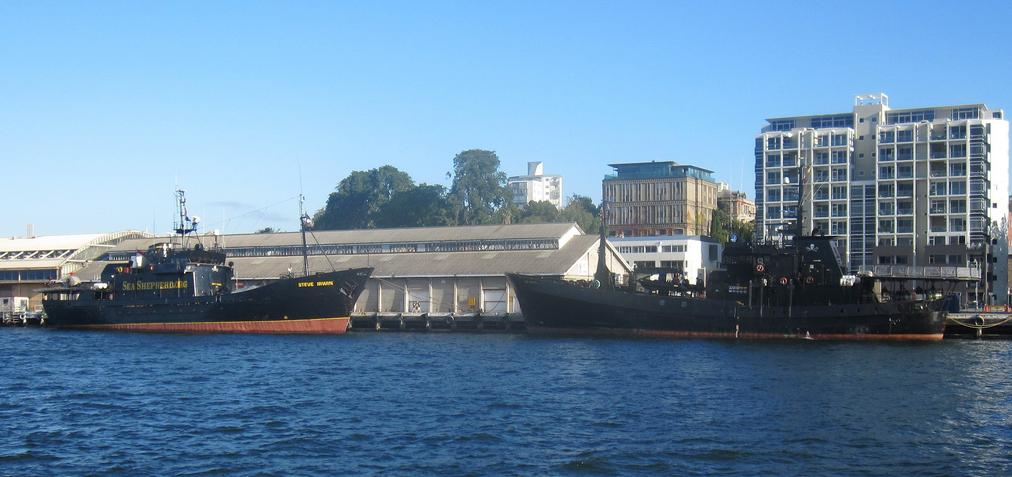
The MY Steve Irwin (left) and the MY Bob Barker (right), here both docked in Hobart

Neptune's Navy is the name that the Sea Shepherd Conservation Society uses to refer to the ships it operates. These vessels are used to disrupt or hinder illegal, unreported and unregulated fishing (IUU), whaling or sealing operations. The name is also used by the Captain Paul Watson Foundation.

== Fleet ==
=== Past ===
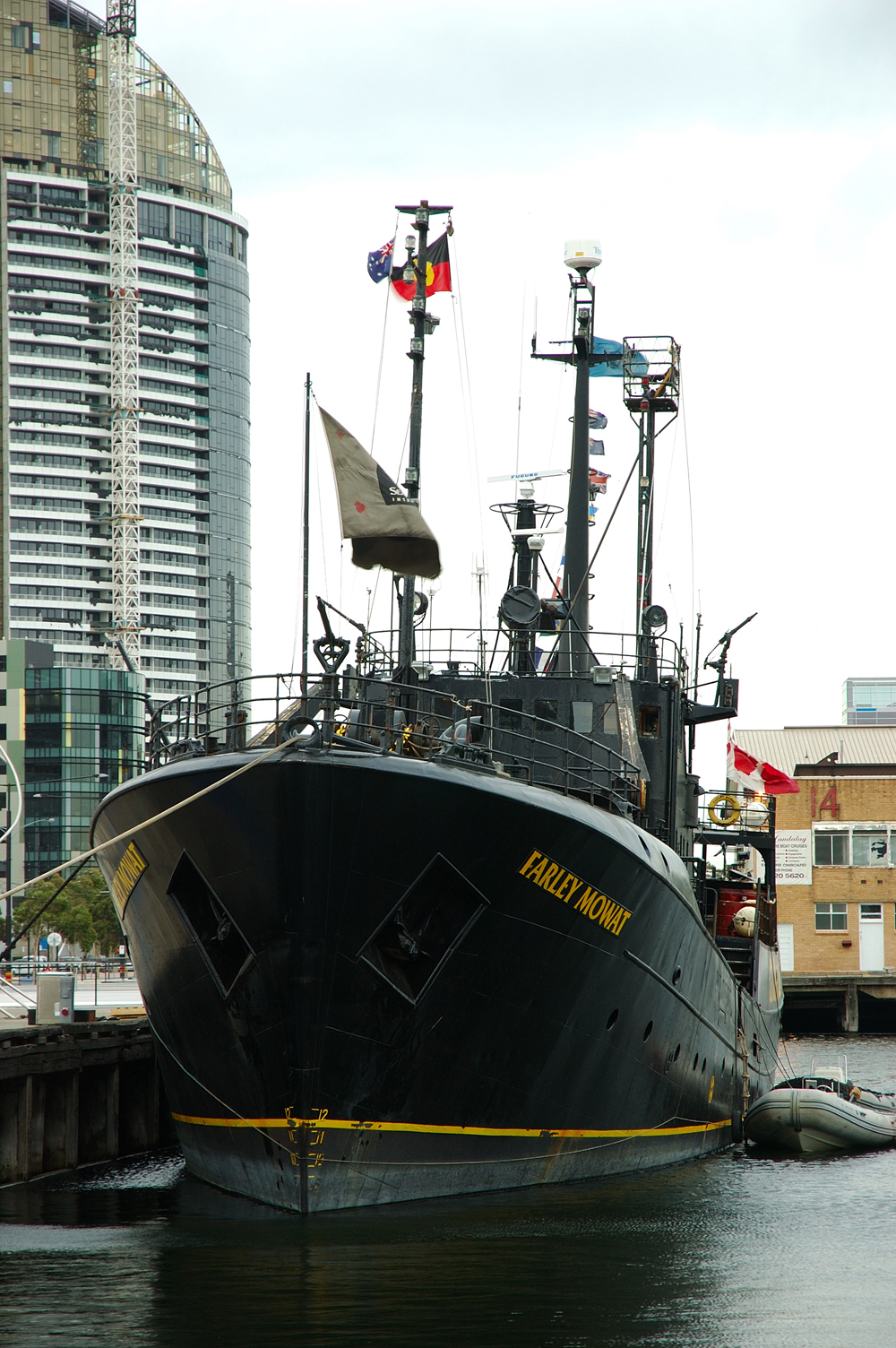
The RV Farley Mowat in Melbourne, Australia. It was permanently seized by the Government of Canada for illegal interference in the seal hunt.

The Ocean Warrior, later renamed the RV Farley Mowat was purchased in 1996 but seized by the Canadian government in April 2008. Due to the age of the vessel, the Society has decided not to pursue any avenue of reacquiring it. Paul Watson in fact stated that they had intentionally utilised a vessel that had become too old for Sea Shepherd to keep in action further.

In June 2009, Sea Shepherd announced that the trimaran Earthrace, later renamed Ady Gil, would accompany its 2009–10 operations against Japanese whaling in the Southern Ocean Whale Sanctuary. Pete Bethune, the operator of the vessel, said that an agreement was reached with Sea Shepherd for the boat to adopt a support role. On October 17, 2009, the Earthrace was presented to the media with a new black paint job, and renamed Ady Gil, after the name of a major sponsor. On January 6, 2010 the vessel was badly damaged in a collision at sea with the Japanese vessel Shōnan Maru 2. The Ady Gil sank on January 8 while she was being towed towards the French Dumont d'Urville Station in Antarctica after it filled with water and became too heavy to tow. The financial loss was estimated at $1.5 million.

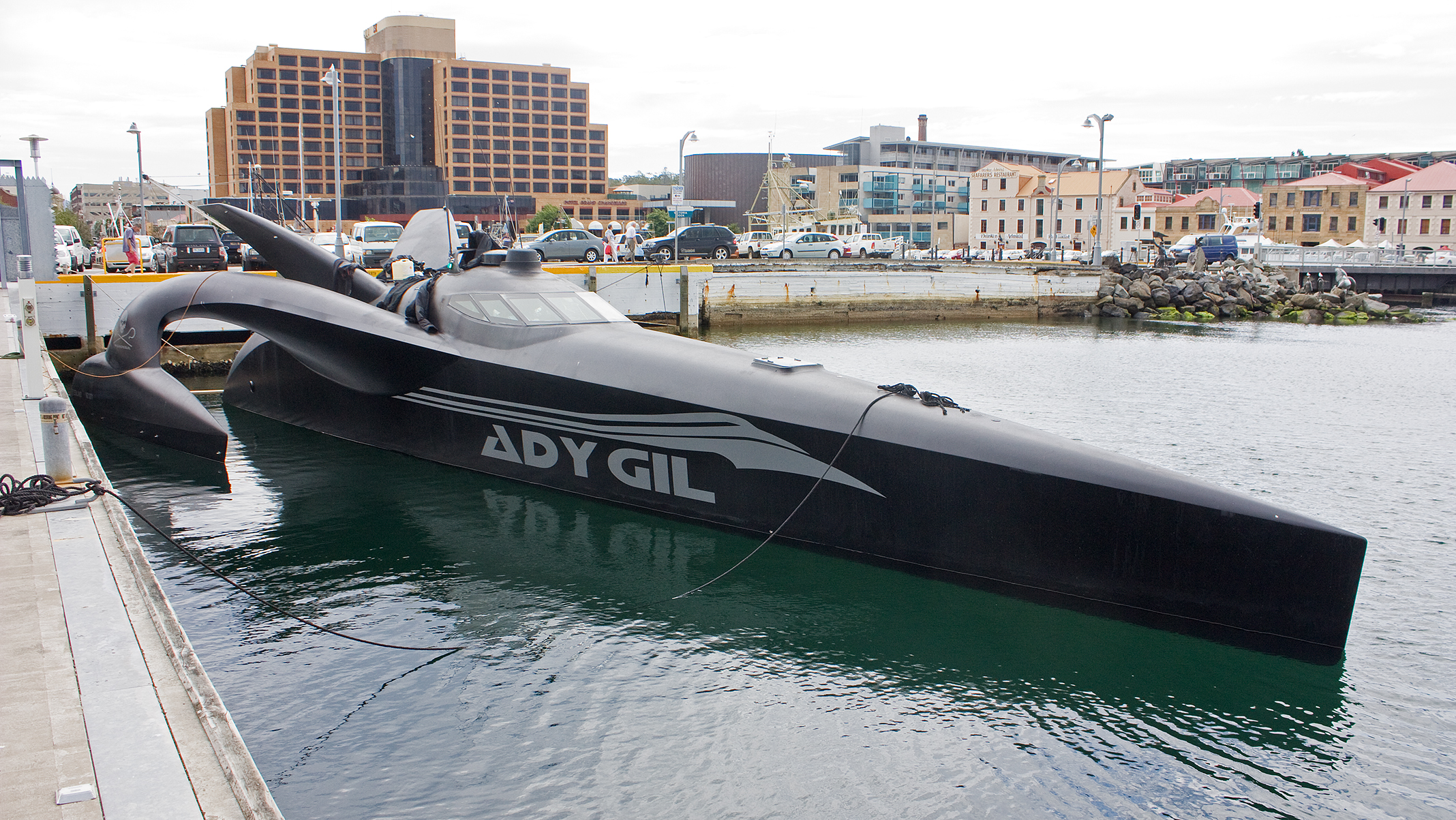
One of Sea Shepherd former boats, the MY Ady Gil in Hobart, Tasmania. The vessel sank after a collision with the MV Shōnan Maru 2, a Japanese whaler

The Steve Irwin was obtained in 2006 and originally called the Robert Hunter. It was renamed in honor of Australian Steve Irwin ("The Crocodile Hunter"). Terri Irwin, his widow, gave her support to Sea Shepherd, saying, "Whales have always been in Steve's heart and in 2006 he was investigating the possibility of joining the Sea Shepherd on part of its journey to defend these beautiful animals." Sea Shepherd operated the MY Steve Irwin until December 2018. Because of high maintenance cost and the ship's age the vessel was decommissioned and retired from the Sea Shepherd Fleet. It will be stripped for parts with most being transferred to the MY Ocean Warrior.

Sea Shepherd acquired the Ocean 7 Adventurer for its 2011 campaign against Japanese whaling in the Antarctic, renaming it MV Gojira. After a legal claim, Sea Shepherd renamed it the MV Gojira and later the MV Brigitte Bardot On December 29, 2011 the vessel was damaged by a 6 m (20 ft) rogue wave whilst pursuing the Japanese whaling fleet during Operation Divine Wind off the western coast of Australia. The main hull was cracked and the port side pontoon needed to be held together by straps. In response to this incident and new tactics employed by the Japanese whaling fleet, Paul Watson has stated that he intends to procure more vessels to prevent themselves being outnumbered and shorthanded in future engagements. The ship was later sold in 2020 instead of maintaining it, because of the COVID-19 pandemic.

The 1200-tonne Bob Barker, was named after television game-show host and animal activist Bob Barker, who made the purchase of the retired Norwegian whaling vessel possible with a donation of US$5 million. This ship and the Irwin were both given new dazzle paint jobs in 2011. They were easy to tell apart since as the Irwin has a 77 painted on its bow while the Bob Barker had a shark's mouth design on its bow. In November 2022, Sea Shepherd announced that The Bob Barker would be retired and scrapped due to its thinning hull stating in a post, "The thinning hull and the ageing machinery, means that the vessel can no longer be operated safely. Therefore, Sea Shepherd Global has a responsibility to the safety of life at sea, and the marine environment, to retire the vessel permanently."

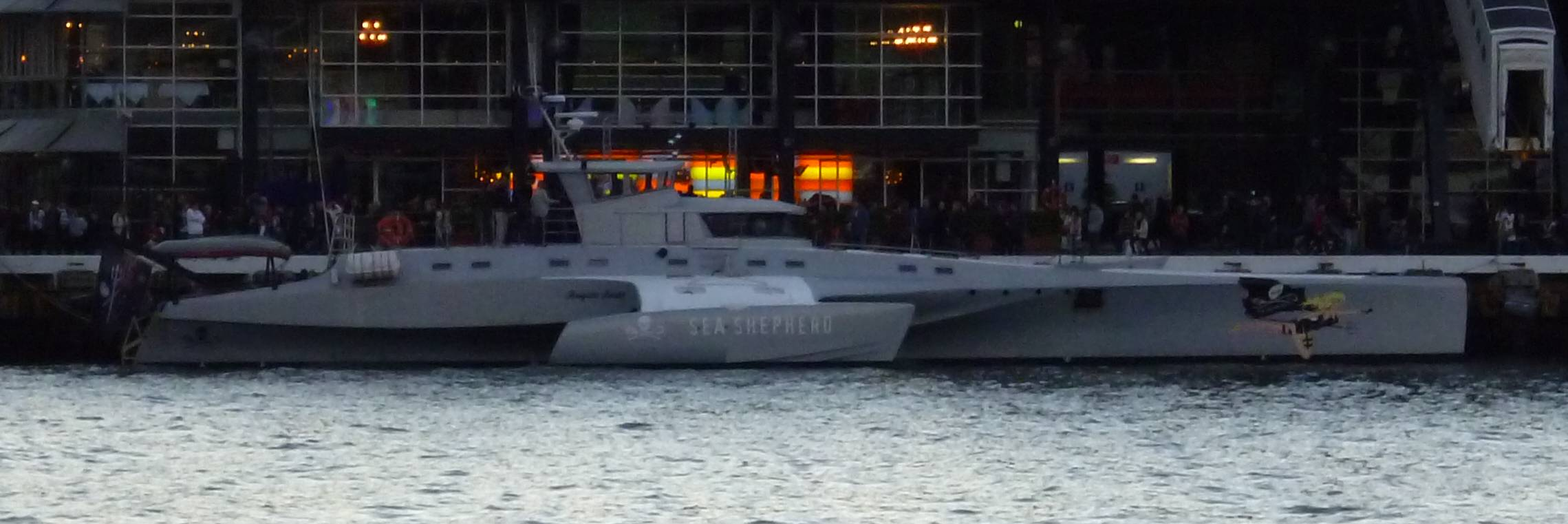
MV Brigitte Bardot docked in Circular Quay, Sydney

Past vessels
Vessel name	Years in use	Flagged	Fate
Sea Shepherd/Sea Shepherd I	1978–1979	UK	Retired
Sea Shepherd II	1980–1992	UK	Retired
Divine Wind	1987–1988	Panama	Sold
Edward Abbey/Sirenian	1990–2005	USA/Canada	Donated to Ecuador
Cleveland Amory	1993–1994	Canada	Retired
Whales Forever	1994–1996	St. Vincent	Retired
Sea Shepherd III (1997); Ocean Warrior (1996); RV Farley Mowat (2002)	1997–2008	Canada (2002), UK (2006), Belize (2006–2007), Netherlands (2008)	Seized by the Canadian Department of Fisheries and Oceans
Earthrace/MY Ady Gil	2010	New Zealand	Partnership; Sank after collision
Golfo Azzurro	2012	Netherlands	Chartered
Robert Hunter/MY Steve Irwin (Sea Shepherd flagship)	2006–2018	UK/Netherlands	Retired in late 2018
MY Alchemy	2018–2019	Marshall Islands	Sold to new owner because of the 2020 coronavirus pandemic
Gojira/MV Brigitte Bardot	2010–2021	Dominica	Retired in June 2021 and sold to private owner
MV White Holly	2018–2021	Dominica	Decommissioned in December 2021 and sold for scrap boats and equipment transferred to the Sharpie.
MY Bob Barker	2009–2022	Netherlands	Decommissioned in November 2022 and sold for scrap with the money raised going into the campaigns of Bob Barker.
MV John Paul DeJoria	2017–2022	Dominica	Decommissioned in 2022. Scrapped in Mexico by Ocean Express Recycling.
MV Sharpie	2017–2022	Dominica	Decommissioned in 2022. Scrapped in Mexico by Ocean Express Recycling.
MY Farley Mowat	2015–2022	Dominica	Decommissioned in 2022. Scrapped in Mexico by Ocean Express Recycling
RV Martin Sheen	2014-2025	USA	Donated to the Captain Paul Watson Foundation in October 2025.

=== Current ===
As of 2023, the conservation society operates a number of ships worldwide, the M/Y Allankay, the M/Y Triton, the M/Y Conrad, the MY Age of Union (formerly the MY Sam Simon), the RV Martin Sheen, the MY Jairo Mora Sandoval, the M/Y Emanuel Bronner, M/Y Seahorse, and the M/Y Ocean Warrior.

Because of what happened with the Brigitte Bardot, Sea Shepherd has transitioned away from yachts and trimarans for fast patrol boats, cutters, and catamarans to modernize its fleet. Sea Shepherd acquired the 56 m (184 ft) long MY Sam Simon in June 2012, the vessel being named after the co-creator of The Simpsons who made a sizable donation to finance the vessel's purchase. Sam Simon was formerly operated by the Japan Meteorological Agency at the Maizuru Marine Laboratory under the name Seifu Maru.

In January 2015, Sea Shepherd USA purchased two recently decommissioned U.S. Coast Guard patrol vessels. They are considerably faster than the other ships, with a top speed of 30 knots. These two ships are both 110-foot (34 m) Island-class patrol boats and are named MY John Paul DeJoria, (formerly named Jules Verne) and MY Farley Mowat. In December 2017, Sea Shepherd unveiled a third U.S. Coast Guard patrol vessel, the MV Sharpie. This vessel is identical to the Farley Mowat and the John Paul DeJoria.

On January 26, 2015, at the annual Goed Geld Gala (Good Money Gala) in Amsterdam, Sea Shepherd received a donation of €8.3 million ($9.4 million) to purchase a new vessel for Sea Shepherd's submitted dream project "Stop Illegal Fishing in the Southern Ocean". The vessel was built by Dutch ship builder Damen in Turkey, with a final cost of $12 million. This custom-built ship is a Damen Stan patrol vessel 50 m long and 9 m wide. It was christened MY Ocean Warrior and it was launched in September 2016. The Ocean Warrior is the current flagship, it has four engines capable of a maximum speed of 30 knots (56 km/h), so it can outrun any ship in Japan's whaling fleet; it is also equipped with additional long-range fuel tanks. Its maiden voyage was to be part of the 2016-2017 Operation Nemesis in the Southern Ocean.

On September 17, 2020 Sea Shepherd acquired the MY Conrad to replace the Bardot and the Alchemy for work in the Mediterranean because of the cost to ship those vessels there because of the pandemic and because of maintenance.

On April 27, 2021, Sea Shepherd announced the purchase of a new ship, the Sea Eagle. The ship was purchased with the assistance of Allianz and will mostly be used for work in the Mediterranean Sea.

On July 8, 2022 Sea Shepherd acquired the Sharkwater from Fins Attached and added it to their fleet. Sea Shepherd plans to outfit the vessel for campaigns in Mexico to save the Vaquita and to stop driftnetting in the Gulf of California and in Galapagos.

On October 15, 2025, it was announced by the Ocean Conservation group the Captain Paul Watson Foundation (CPWF) that they and Sea Shepherd Conservation Society had agreed to allow Sea Shepherd to donate the RV Martin Sheen to the CPWF's growing fleet.

Fleet as of 2022
Vessel name	Years in service	Flagged
MY Age of Union	2012–present	Netherlands
MY Jairo Mora Sandoval	2013–present	UK
MY Ocean Warrior (fleet flagship)	2016–present	Netherlands
MV Emanuel Bronner	2017–present	Germany
MY Conrad	2020–present	Italy
MY Sea Eagle	2021–present	Netherlands
MV Sharkwater	2022–present	USA
MV Triton	2022–present	Germany

== Other watercraft ==
The group has also operated smaller boats in its campaigns including jet skis, Delta RHIB and Zodiac inflatables deployed off of the larger vessels. In 1999 Sea Shepherd briefly obtained a small personal submarine in hopes of using it against tribal whalers. The sub was never fully functional and Sea Shepherd decided to sell it instead for an undisclosed price.

== Aircraft ==
In addition to their maritime assets, Sea Shepherd also operates several types of aircraft from their ships; these have included Sikorsky S-300 and MD 500 helicopters which typically are carried aboard the Steve Irwin, unmanned drones, and a microlight aircraft that was briefly used during their campaign in the Faroe Islands. The aircraft are used to conduct forward reconnaissance to search for targets beyond visual range, as well as to monitor operations once a target is acquired.

== Registration concerns ==
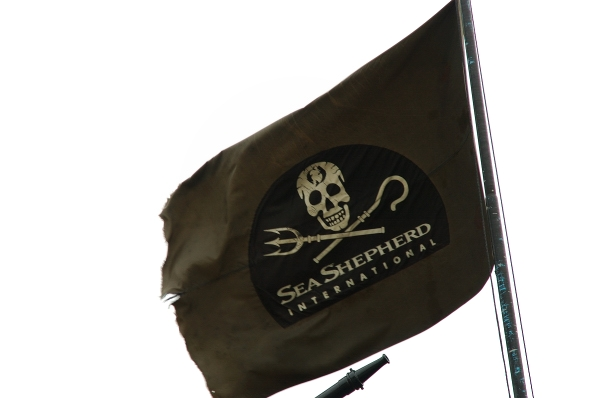
Sea Shepherd flag flying on the RV Farley Mowat.

The vessels being engaged in controversial activities has caused registration issues with multiple governments, and the ships of the fleet have flown the flags of several different nations.

In August 2006, the Farley Mowat had its registration revoked by Canada. Later that year, Japan requested that the United Kingdom strip the Robert Hunter of its flag and for Belize to strip the Farley Mowat of hers. The Robert Hunter was removed from the shipping registers of the United Kingdom since its activities were "inconsistent with her status as a pleasure vessel." The International Merchant Marine Registry of Belize withdrew the use of the nation's flag after finding the Farley Mowat was not being used as a pleasure craft and stated that "it could not condone acts that threatened life and property at sea." The Mohawk Traditional Council of Kahnawake offered support and flags of the Iroquois Confederacy to fly on the Farley Mowat and the Robert Hunter.

In early 2010, the Bob Barker briefly falsely flew a Norwegian flag with the intent to deceive Japanese whalers.

The Steve Irwin now sails under the Dutch flag, but legislation was introduced to ban the group from using it. The junior transport minister later noted that there was no further intention of deregistering the Steve Irwin. In February 2010, after repeated requests by Japan, a new bill was introduced which would modify the registry law to allow ships to be struck from the registry if their conduct harmed the Netherlands' reputation.

Also in February 2010, Japan announced that Togo had struck the Bob Barker from its registry. The Bob Barker has since been re-registered in the Netherlands.

== See Also ==
- Paul Watson Foundation Fleet: Fleet formed by Paul Watson after leaving Sea Shepherd in 2022
- Green Peace Fleet: Green Peace's Fleet of anti-whaling ships
- MY Modoc: A tug boat owned by former Sea Shepherd Pete Bethune's Earthrace Conservation organization which participates with Costa Rica and Panama governments in their efforts to thwart illegal fishing and wildlife poaching
