= Farley Mowat (ship) =

Two Sea Shepherd vessels have been named Farley Mowat, after the Canadian writer and environmentalist:

- RV Farley Mowat, a former fisheries research vessel, operated 1996–2008
- MY Farley Mowat, a former US Coast Guard patrol boat, acquired in 2016
