= RV Martin Sheen =

Sailboat

History

United States
- Name: Caribana
- Namesake: Martin Sheen
- Launched: 1977
- Fate: Ocean Alliance sold it to Sea Shepherd USA in 2014. Sea Shepherd USA subsequently donated it to the Captain Paul Watson Foundation in 2025.

History

United States
- Name: Martin Sheen
- Acquired: 2014
- Identification: MMSI number: 367794730; Callsign: WDJ6134
- Status: in service

General characteristics
- Class & type: Sailboat
- Displacement: 38 tons
- Length: 80 ft (24 m)
- Beam: 20.6 ft
- Depth of hold: 8 ft
- Propulsion: Sail and one diesel engine
- Complement: Hull ID: BL2A76ECL697 (aluminum)
- Notes: Research vessel. USCG Doc. No.: 1228821

RV Martin Sheen is a sailboat formerly owned and operated by the Sea Shepherd Conservation Society. Originally built in 1977 as the Yacht Caribana by Palmer Johnson Yachts in Sturgeon Bay, Wisconsin, U.S.A., it was acquired by the Conservation group Ocean Alliance in 1992. Renamed Odyssey, the Ocean Alliance operated the vessel until it was sold to the Sea Shepherd Conservation Society in 2015.

Since 1992, the vessel has and is still being used as a research vessel to study the plastic debris and microplastics contamination in the oceans, as well as researching marine oil spills.

In October 2025, the vessel was donated by Sea Shepherd to the Ocean Conservation Organization the Captain Paul Watson Foundation. The ship was named in honor of the American actor and supporter of Sea Shepherd, Martin Sheen.

== See also ==
- Neptune's Navy, Sea Shepherd boats
- Sea Shepherd Conservation Society operations
