= MV John Paul DeJoria =

US Coast Guard cutter ship

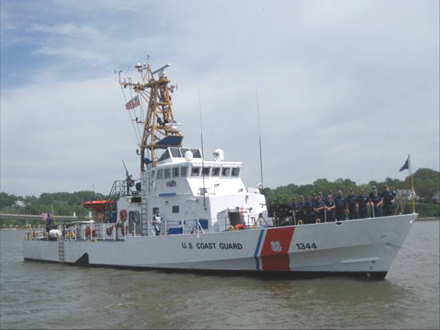
- Original ship/paint scheme: USCGC Block Island

History

United States
- Name: Block Island
- Namesake: Block Island
- Owner: United States Coast Guard
- Builder: Bollinger Shipyards, Lockport, Louisiana
- Yard number: 226
- Completed: 12 July 1991
- Decommissioned: 14 March 2014
- Identification: Hull number: WPB-1344
- Fate: Transferred to Sea Shepherd Conservation Society

History
- Name: Jules Verne (2015–2017); John Paul DeJoria (2017–2022)
- Owner: Sea Shepherd Conservation Society
- Port of registry: Bridgetown, Barbados
- Acquired: January 2015
- In service: 2017–2022
- Out of service: 2022
- Identification: IMO number: 4685353; Call sign: J7AB9; MMSI number: 325942000
- Fate: Scrapped in Mexico by Ocean Express Recycling

General characteristics
- Class & type: Island-class cutter
- Displacement: 168 tons
- Length: 110 ft (34 m)
- Beam: 21 ft (6.4 m)
- Draft: 6.5 ft (2.0 m)
- Propulsion: 2 Paxman Valenta or Caterpillar diesels
- Speed: 30 knots (56 km/h; 35 mph)
- Range: 3,300 miles
- Endurance: 5 days

MV John Paul DeJoria (formerly USCGC Block Island (WPB-1344)) was a former United States Coast Guard cutter owned and operated by the Sea Shepherd Conservation Society. Until scrapped, she was used in their direct action campaigns against illegal fisheries activities.

In January 2015, Sea Shepherd purchased two decommissioned Island-class patrol boats from the United States Coast Guard, capable of a top speed of 30 knots (56 km/h; 35 mph). They were USCGC Block Island and USCGC Pea Island, and were renamed MV Jules Verne and MY Farley Mowat after famous authors, respectively. They were joined by another ex-USCG island class cutter in December 2017, the MV Sharpie.

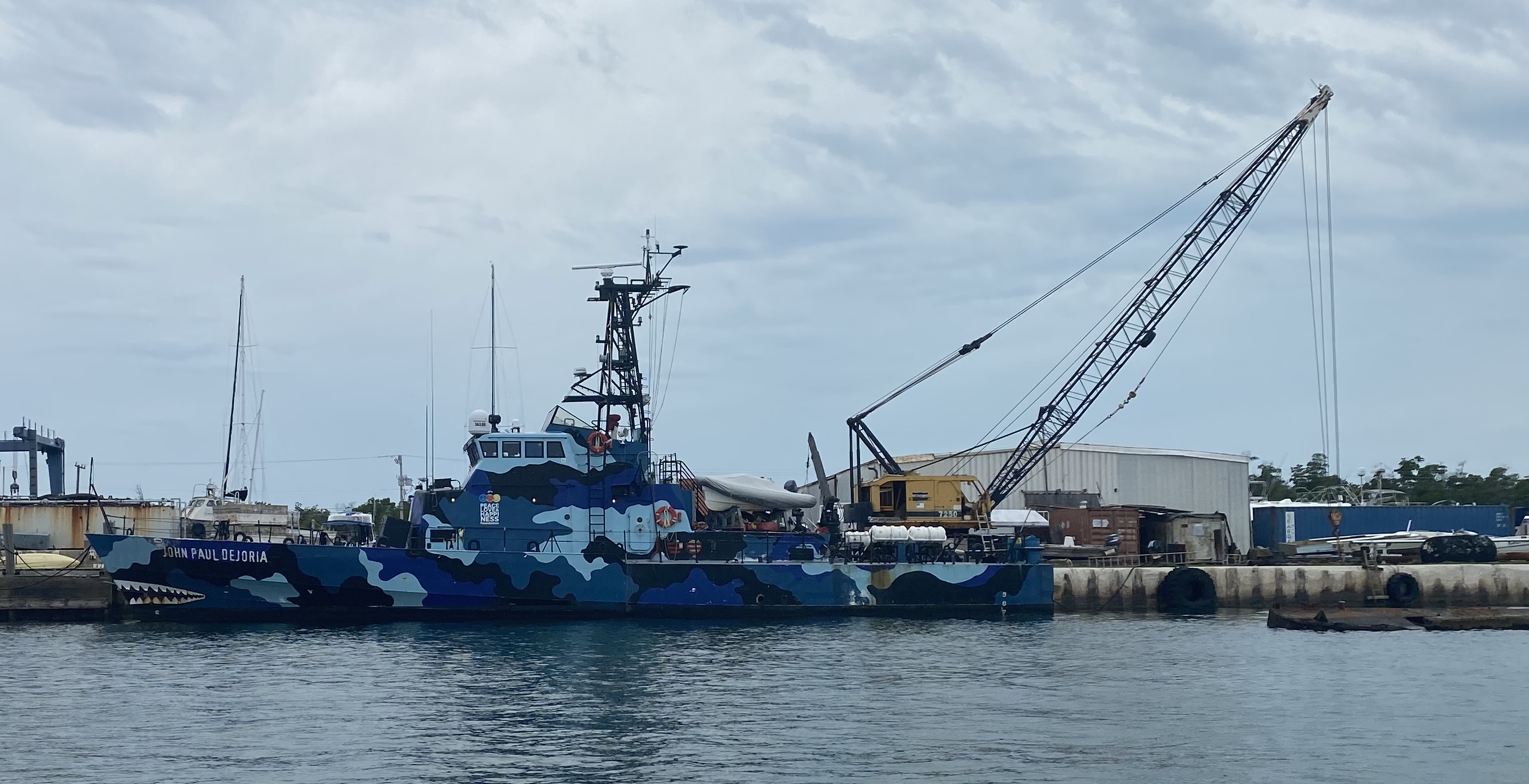
MV John Paul DeJoria in Stock Island, FL

Jules Verne was then renamed MV John Paul DeJoria on 31 January 2017, honouring Sea Shepherd supporter John Paul DeJoria. Under the new name, the ship's first mission was to join the search for the missing filmmaker Rob Stewart in the Florida Keys.

== John Paul DeJoria II ==
In December 2022, it was announced that the former Scottish Fisheries Protection Agency patrol vessel Vigilant had been acquired by Captain Paul Watson's newly founded environmental protection organization Captain Paul Watson Foundation and re-named John Paul DeJoria.

== See also ==
- Neptune's Navy, Sea Shepherd boats
- Sea Shepherd Conservation Society operations
