= MY Alchemy =

Yacht company

History

Marshall Islands
- Name: MY Alchemy
- Owner: Private Owner
- Operator: Private Owner
- Port of registry: Marshall Islands
- Builder: Feadship
- Launched: 1970
- Acquired: March 2018
- In service: March 2018
- Identification: Call sign: V7TT8; IMO number: 8734281; MMSI number: 538070715
- Status: active
- Notes: Originally launched as MY Intent

General characteristics : Alchemy
- Type: Pleasure yacht, steel
- Tonnage: 235 t
- Length: 40.27 m (132.1 ft)
- Beam: 7.37 m (24.2 ft)
- Draft: 7.37 m (24.2 ft)
- Installed power: 85 kW Northern Light, 65 kW Northern Light
- Propulsion: 2 x Caterpillar 348
- Speed: Cruise: 11.5 KN; Max: 12.5 KN
- Range: 3,500 Nautical miles

MY Alchemy is a luxury yacht currently owned and operated by the Sea Shepherd Conservation Society since March 2018.

Alchemy was donated in March 2018 by Alison, Lyle, and Taggart Turner to Sea Shepherd. The Turners are founders of the biotechnology company Invitrogen, as well as Alchemy Ventures, an organization that supports coral reef research and conservation. The vessel was retrofitted in 2014 and it features scuba diving facilities.

The Alchemy was purchased by a private investor in August 2019.

== See also ==
- Neptune's Navy, Sea Shepherd vessels
- Sea Shepherd Conservation Society operations
