= MV Sharpie =

Island-class patrol boat

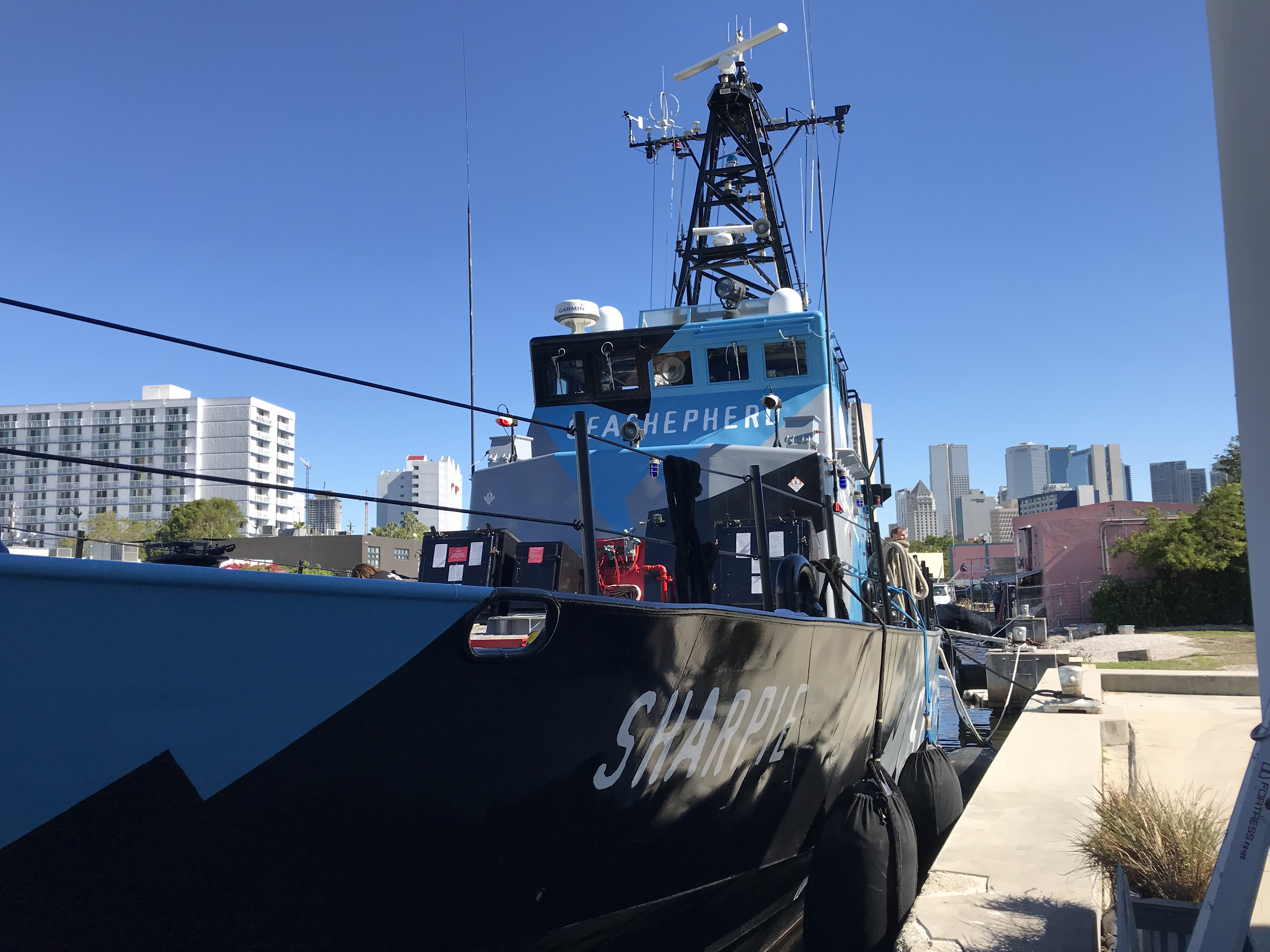
- MV Sharpie

History

United States
- Owner: United States Coast Guard
- Operator: as Bainbridge Island (WPB-1343)
- Builder: Bollinger Shipyards, Lockport, Louisiana
- Launched: 1991
- Out of service: 17 March 2014
- Home port: Bayonne, NJ
- Name: Since December 2017: MV Sharpie
- Namesake: Chris Sharp
- Owner: Sea Shepherd Conservation Society
- Operator: Since 11 December 2017: Sea Shepherd Conservation Society
- Identification: MMSI number: 325925000
- Fate: Scrapped in Mexico by Ocean Express Recycling

General characteristics
- Class & type: Island-class patrol boat
- Type: cutter
- Tonnage: 168 GT
- Length: 34 m (112 ft)
- Beam: 6.4 m (21 ft)
- Height: 2.0 m (6 ft 7 in)
- Draught: 7.0 m (23.0 ft)
- Propulsion: Two V-16 Caterpillar diesels
- Speed: 29.5 knots
- Range: 3,300 miles
- Endurance: 5 days

The MV Sharpie was a vessel owned and operated by the Sea Shepherd Conservation Society starting in December 2017. She was being used in their direct action campaigns against illegal fisheries activities.

== Overview ==
The ship was an Island-class patrol boat built by Bollinger Shipyards, Lockport, Louisiana and first launched in 1991 as the U.S. Coast Guard cutter Bainbridge Island. The vessel was identical to her sister ships MY Farley Mowat and MV John Paul DeJoria. After 22 years of service, it was retired in a ceremony in New Jersey on 17 March 2014.

The vessel was purchased by Medtech entrepreneur Chris Sharp and donated to Sea Shepherd Conservation Society, and it was presented at a press conference on 11 December 2017 in Miami, Florida. The vessel was renamed MV Sharpie, named after its donor. She is 34-metre (112 ft) long, powered by two Caterpillar diesel engines, and can travel at a maximum speed of 29.5 knots (54.6 km/h; 33.9 mph) with a range of 3,300 nautical miles (6,100 km; 3,800 mi).

== Incidents ==
In January 2019, a "mob of over 50 skiffs" threw Molotov cocktails and rocks, burning the MV Sharpie's hull and breaking windows.

In February 2020, the MV Sharpie was fired upon while on "routine" patrol of the Vaquita Refuge in the Gulf of California.

== See also ==
- Neptune's Navy, Sea Shepherd vessels
- Sea Shepherd Conservation Society operations
