= Sea Shepherd II =

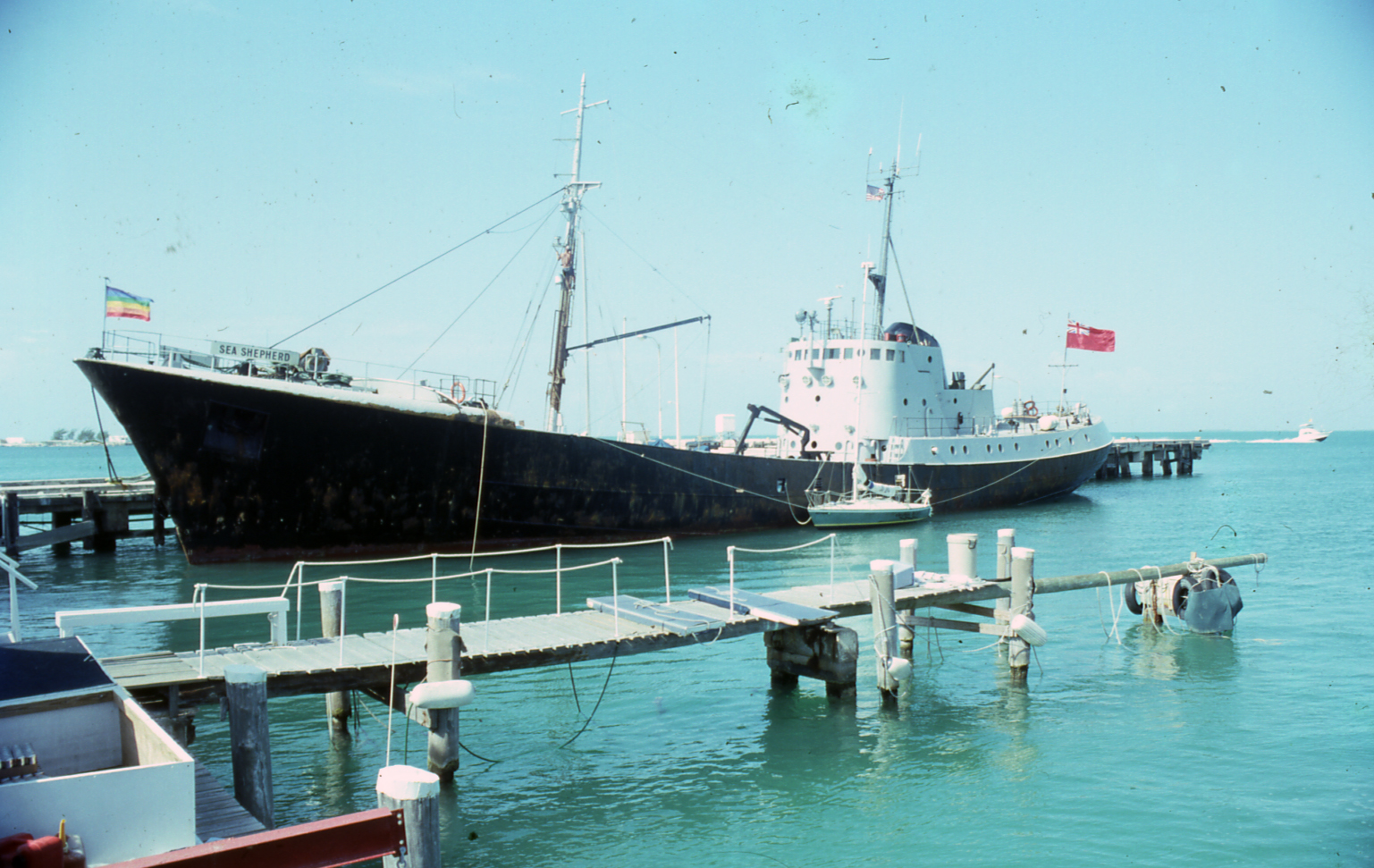

History
- Owner: Sea Shepherd Conservation Society
- Port of registry: United Kingdom
- Acquired: 1980
- Identification: IMO number: 5305912
- Fate: Sold 1992

General characteristics
- Type: Fishing trawler
- Tonnage: 657 tons

Sea Shepherd II was a former 657-ton fishing trawler owned by the Sea Shepherd Conservation Society. Sea Shepherd II was registered in the UK port of Glasgow. The ship took part in numerous campaigns, most of which were anti-sealing campaigns in Canada. She was acquired in 1980 with money received for the film rights to the story of the Sierra campaign, and replaced the nearly identical Sea Shepherd I. Sea Shepherd reports that equipment from the ship was sold in 1992 and the hull was sold later. In 2004 the ship was considered derelict and in danger of sinking resulting in the vessel being broken up at Esquimalt graving dock in July 2004.
