= MY Jairo Mora Sandoval =

MY Jairo Mora Sandoval (MMSI number: 235101489) is a vessel in the Sea Shepherd Conservation Society fleet. It was purchased by Sea Shepherd UK and announced on June 26, 2013. The vessel was named after Jairo Mora Sandoval, a sea turtle conservationist murdered in Costa Rica in May 2013.

== Operation Sunu Gaal ==
In January 2014, it was announced that the Jairo Mora Sandoval was deployed in West Africa to assist the Senegal government in locating illegal fishing operations.
