= Glenn Inwood =

New Zealand political operative (born 1968)

- Born: Glenn Hema Inwood; 1968 (age 57–58)
- Citizenship: New Zealander
- Education: University of Canterbury
- Occupations: Journalist, Businessman, Lobbyist & Public relations advisor

Glenn Inwood is a New Zealand right-wing political operative and public relations advisor. Inwood was the founder of the now-defunct Wellington-based Omeka Public Relations company. His duties with Omeka included acting as the speaker for the Institute of Cetacean Research, a Japanese organisation that lobbies on behalf of the Japanese whaling industry. The controversial nature of his role led him to be dubbed "Ginza Glen" by anti-whaling activists. Inwood also operates Wellington based media company Spin It Wide which distributes press releases from Imperial Tobacco. In 2021 Inwood established the far-right pseudo-news outlet and political organising operation Resistance Kiwi, which operates on Twitter, Telegram, and previously, on a now-defunct website. Inwood is also the founder of Better Wellington a conspiracy-aligned rightwing political campaign group aimed at influencing local politics in Wellington.

== Early life and journalism ==
Born in 1968, Inwood is of Māori descent and affiliates with Ngāti Kahungunu and Ngāi Tūhoe iwi. Inwood was raised by a Pākehā family in New Zealand. He studied Māori language and law at university and subsequently worked as a journalist. Inwood has been a writer and editor for newspapers including Christchurch Star, The Press in Christchurch and the Evening Post in Wellington. He also produced Radio New Zealand's flagship programme Morning Report. Inwood joined the Te Ohu Kai Moana (the Treaty of Waitangi Fisheries Commission) as communications manager in 1999.

In 2000 he won an award from the Public Relations Institute of New Zealand for "Stop The Wall", a campaign on behalf of Waterfront Watch, Wellington.

== Press secretary tenure and resignation ==
Inwood worked as a press secretary for Lianne Dalziel, Immigration Minister in the New Zealand Labour Party government. He also worked simultaneously for Morris Communications on the account of the Treaty of Waitangi Fisheries Commission. In November 2000, the commission hosted the 3rd Annual General Assembly of the World Council of Whalers in Nelson. After Inwood's dual role as a ministerial press adviser and speaker at a pro-whaling conference was raised in parliament, Prime Minister Helen Clark found his "connections with whaling distasteful" and directed Inwood not to attend. On 28 September 2000 Inwood resigned his position as Dalziel's press adviser.

== Working for the whalers ==
Inwood left the Fisheries Commission in 2003 to run his own public relations company, Omeka Public Relations. In March 2003, Inwood organised a tour of Australasia by the former secretary of the International Whaling Commission, Dr. Ray Gambell, who was urging an end to the moratorium on commercial whaling. The tour was sponsored by the World Council of Whalers. Inwood works as a PR consultant to the Treaty of Waitangi Fisheries Commission and the Institute of Cetacean Research.

Inwood also works for Te Ohu Kaimoana, "the sole voting shareholder in Aotearoa Fisheries, which owns a 50 per cent shareholding in Sealord. The other half-share in Sealord is owned by the Japanese company, Nissui.

Inwood's firm, Omeka, also works for Imperial Tobacco New Zealand, Japan Fisheries Agency, Japan Whaling Association, Species Management Specialists, and the World Council of Whalers.

Inwood is cited as the author in the Portable Document Format properties of a document that iterates alleged actions by the Sea Shepherd Conservation Society against whaling entities internationally.

=== Spy flights ===
Inwood, along with another man, chartered several flights out of Albany and Hobart in December 2009 and January 2010. The spy flights were paid for by Omeka Public Relations and attempted to locate the vessels of whaling protesters. Early reports indicated that Inwood posed as a government employee monitoring the ships for search and rescue purposes. While the spy flights were condemned by Australian Prime Minister Julia Gillard and Greg Hunt, charges have not been filed. The incident led to the introduction by Rachel Siewert of a parliamentary bill to ban Japanese whalers from using Australian planes to spy on protesters.
