= MY Farley Mowat =

Coast guard cutter acquired in 2015

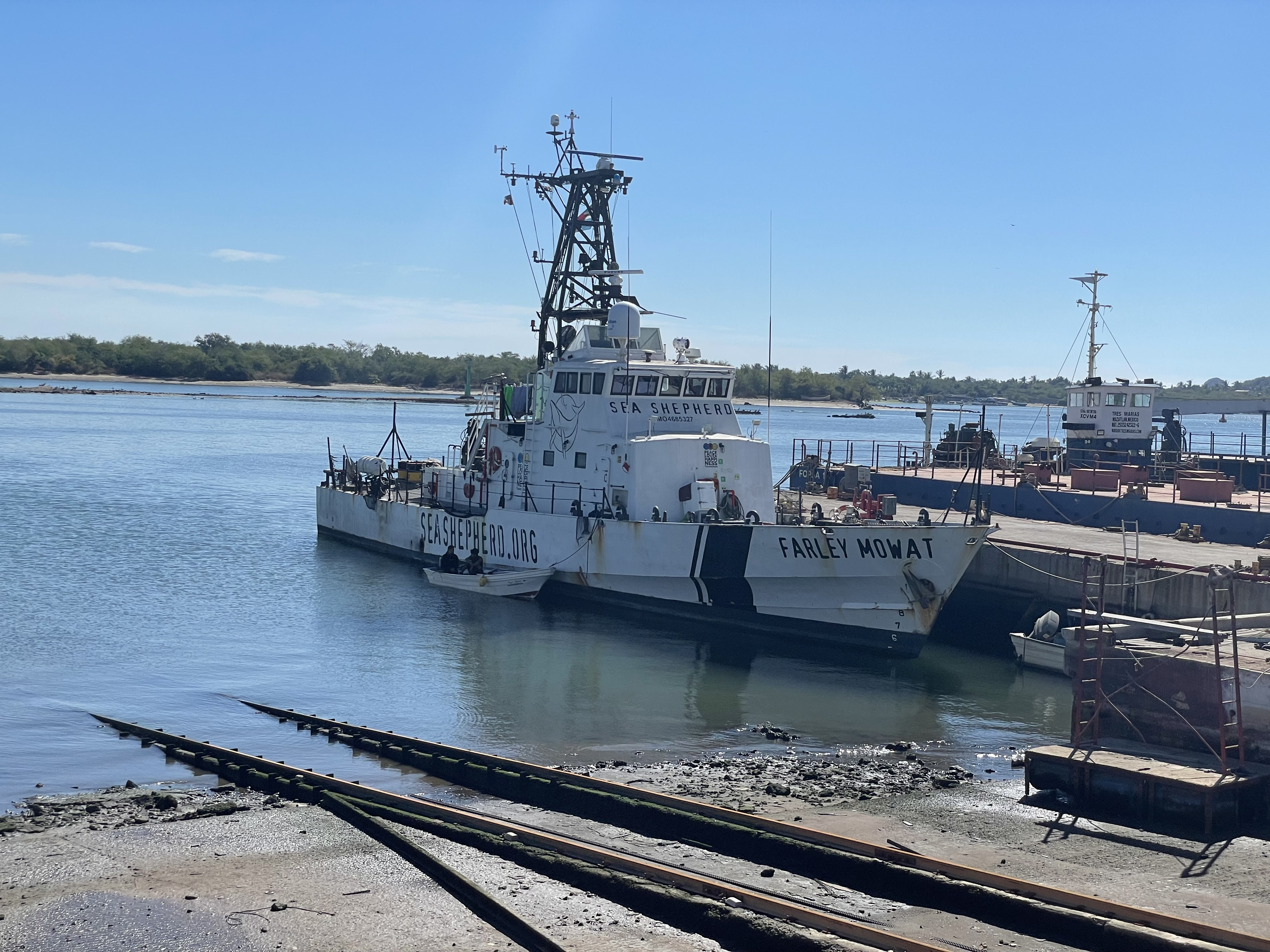
- Farley Mowat at dock

History

United States
- Name: Pea Island
- Namesake: Pea Island
- Owner: United States Coast Guard
- Builder: Bollinger Shipyards, Lockport, Louisiana
- Yard number: 229
- Acquired: 25 October 1991
- Identification: Hull number: WPB-1347
- Fate: Transferred to Sea Shepherd Conservation Society

History
- Name: Farley Mowat
- Owner: Sea Shepherd Conservation Society
- Acquired: January 2015
- In service: 2015
- Identification: Call sign: J7AL5; MMSI number: 314095000
- Fate: Scrapped in Mazatlán, Sinaloa, Mexico by Ocean Express Recycling

General characteristics
- Type: Island-class patrol boat
- Displacement: 168 tons
- Length: 110 ft (34 m)
- Beam: 21 ft (6.4 m)
- Draft: 6.5 ft (2.0 m)
- Propulsion: 2 Paxman Valenta or Caterpillar diesels
- Speed: 30 knots (56 km/h; 35 mph)
- Range: 3,300 miles
- Endurance: 5 days

MY Farley Mowat (formerly USCGC Pea Island (WPB-1347)) was a cutter owned and operated by the Sea Shepherd Conservation Society. She was used in their direct action campaigns against whaling and against illegal fisheries activities.

In January 2015, Sea Shepherd purchased two decommissioned Island-class patrol boats from the United States Coast Guard, capable of a top speed of 30 knots (56 km/h; 35 mph). They were USCGC Block Island and USCGC Pea Island, and were renamed MY Jules Verne and MY Farley Mowat, respectively. The Jules Verne was later renamed the MV John Paul DeJoria after Sea Shepherd supporter John Paul DeJoria. They were joined by another ex-USCG island class cutter in December 2017, the MV Sharpie. The MY Farley Mowat served in the Sea Shepherd's Operation Milagro alongside the MY Sam Simon, MV White Holly and MV Sharpie.

== See also ==
Ship's black and white Sea Shepherd racing stripe

- Neptune's Navy, Sea Shepherd fleet
- Sea Shepherd Conservation Society operations
