= MY Ocean Warrior =

Dutch cutter-class vessel

Netherlands
- Name: Ocean Warrior
- Owner: Sea Shepherd Global
- Operator: Sea Shepherd Global
- Port of registry: Amsterdam, Netherlands
- Builder: Damen Group, Turkey
- Cost: A$12 million
- Laid down: 18 August 2015
- Launched: 1 July 2016
- Commissioned: 9 September 2016
- In service: Since 2016
- Identification: Call sign: PB4400; IMO number: 9791262; MMSI number: 244890807
- Status: in active service

General characteristics
- Class & type: Damen Stan 5009 "Sea Axe"
- Length: 50.20 m (164.7 ft)
- Beam: 9.32 m (30.6 ft)
- Draught: 3.50 m (11.48 ft)
- Depth: 4.45 m (14.60 ft)
- Installed power: 5–10 MW; 4× diesel engine
- Propulsion: 4× fixed-pitch propellers
- Speed: 25 to 30 knots (46 to 56 km/h; 29 to 35 mph)
- Range: 1,125 nautical miles, at maximum speed
- Aircraft carried: 1× MD 500 helicopter can be embarked

MY Ocean Warrior is a cutter-class vessel owned and operated by the Sea Shepherd Conservation Society as research/survey patrol vessel. She is used in their direct action campaigns against whaling and illegal fisheries activities.

== Overview ==
On January 26, 2015, at the annual Goed Geld Gala (Good Money Gala) in Amsterdam, Sea Shepherd received a donation of €8.3 million ($9.4 million) from the Nationale Postcode Loterij in the Netherlands, to purchase a new vessel for Sea Shepherd's submitted dream project "Stop Illegal Fishing in the Southern Ocean". The vessel was custom-built by Dutch ship builder Damen Group in Turkey, with a final cost of $12 million. This custom-built ship is a Damen Stan patrol vessel 50 m long and 9 m wide. She was laid down in 2015 and was launched at the shipyards of Damen Group in Antalya Turkey on 1 July 2016.

Ocean Warrior has four engines, additional long-range fuel tanks, and a helicopter landing pad. She is also equipped with a heavy water cannon on her stern. Her maiden voyage was to the Southern Ocean.
