= At the Edge of the World (2008 film) =

- Theatrical release poster
- Directed by: Dan Stone
- Produced by: Dan Stone
- Starring: Paul Watson; Alex Cornelissen
- Release date: September 2008 (TIFF)
- Running time: 90 minutes
- Country: United States
- Language: English

At the Edge of the World is a 2008 documentary which chronicles the efforts of animal rights activist Paul Watson and 45 other volunteers, who set out in two Sea Shepherd ships to hinder the Japanese whaling fleet in the waters around Antarctica. The film won Best Environmental Film at the Vancouver International Film Festival. Director and Producer Dan Stone would later produce the first season of Whale Wars. It depicts what actually went on during this excursion, with clips of beautiful scenery, news clips, whaling in action, and life on the ship.

== Synopsis ==
The documentary follows the events that took place during Operation Leviathan in early 2007. The RV Farley Mowat, captained by Paul Watson and the newly acquired MY Robert Hunter, captained by Alex Cornelissen meet in the Southern Ocean. As they are docked side to side, material is transferred from the Farley Mowat to the Robert Hunter to build a new helicopter deck. After some time the Robert Hunter is able to find the Nisshin Maru and engages it. In the course, one of the Sea Shepherd's small boats with two men on board gets lost. Both Sea Shepherd vessels must abandon the Nisshin Maru, which later takes part in the search for them. Finally after 9 hours, they are able to locate them and they are saved. Having lost the Nisshin Maru, the Robert Hunter later finds the Kaiko Maru, a spotter vessel for the Japanese whaling fleet. They engage the ship and during maneuvering through an ice field collide with each other, damaging both ships. As the Farley Mowat approaches, the Japanese vessel calls out a Mayday, stopping the Sea Shepherds from further engagement. As the film ends, we find out that there was a fire on the Nisshin Maru, killing one worker and ending the whaling season early due to damage to the ship.

== Cast ==
- Paul Watson as himself
- Alex Cornelissen as himself

== Reception ==
The Globe and Mail reviewer Fiona Morrow called the documentary, "an epic tale of hunter and hunted: a Moby-Dick for the environmental age."

On the review aggregator website Rotten Tomatoes, the film holds an approval rating of 87%, based on 15 reviews, with an average rating of 6.3/10.
