= International Merchant Marine Registry of Belize =

Body for registering a ship in Belize

The flag of Belize.

The International Merchant Marine Registry of Belize (IMMARBE) is the body appointed by the Government of Belize to register ships under the Belizean flag.
