= RV Farley Mowat =

Ship owned and operated by the Sea Shepherd Conservation Society

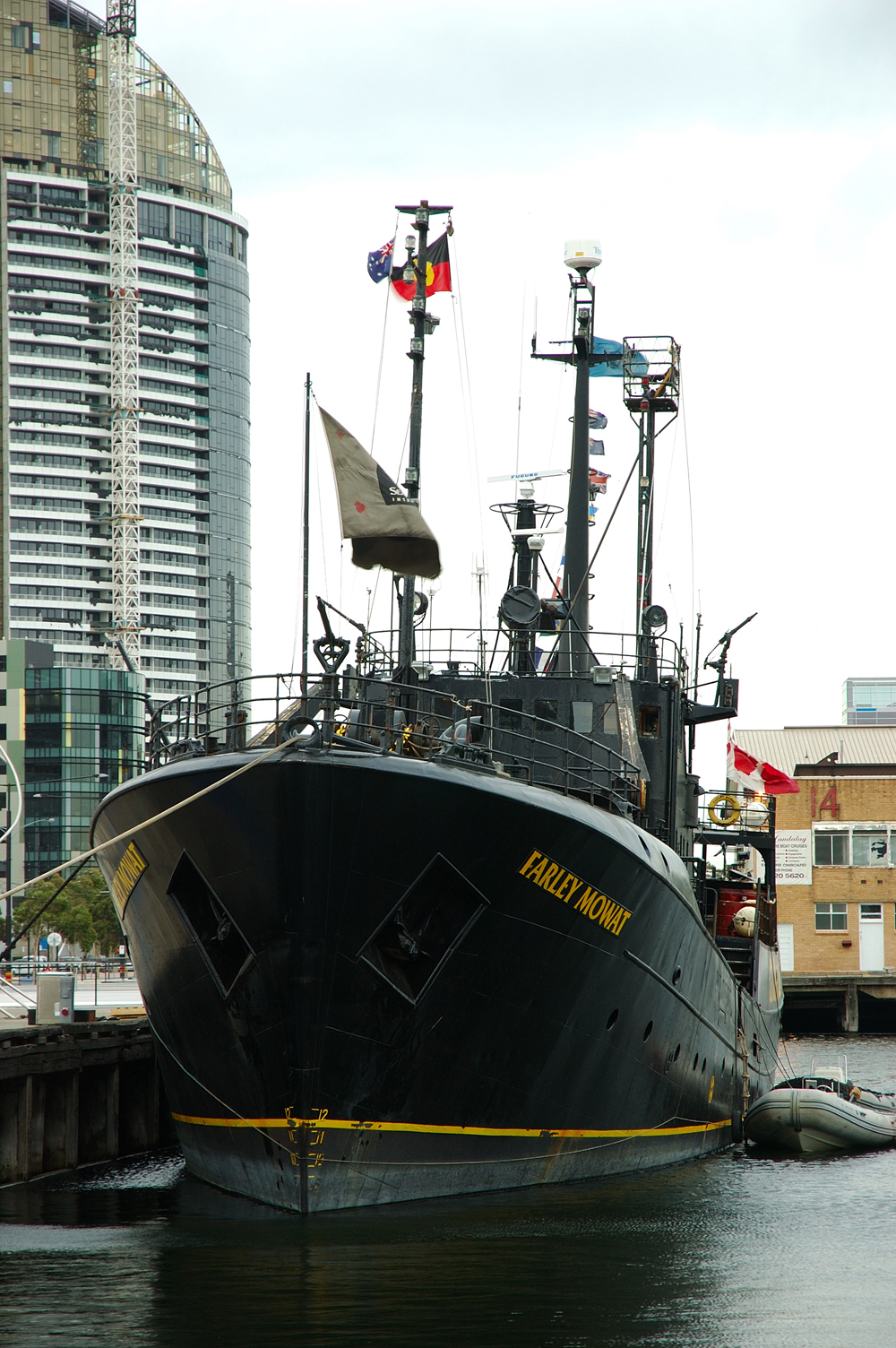
- Farley Mowat at Docklands, Melbourne, Australia

History
- Name: Johan Hjort
- Namesake: Johan Hjort
- Port of registry: Norway
- Builder: Mjellem & Karlsen, Bergen, Norway
- Yard number: 79
- Launched: 1956
- In service: 1957
- Out of service: 1983
- Identification: IMO number: 5172602
- Name: Skandi Ocean
- Port of registry: Norway
- Acquired: 1983
- Identification: IMO number: 5172602
- Name: STM Ocean
- Port of registry: Norway
- Acquired: 1990
- Identification: IMO number: 5172602
- Name: Cam Vulcan
- Port of registry: Norway
- Acquired: 1990
- Identification: IMO number: 5172602
- Name: Sea Shepherd (1997), Ocean Warrior (2000), Farley Mowat (2002)
- Namesake: Farley Mowat
- Owner: Sea Shepherd Conservation Society
- Port of registry: Canada (2002), UK (2006), Belize (2006), (2007), Netherlands (2008)
- Acquired: August 1996
- Out of service: 2008
- Identification: IMO number: 5172602
- Fate: Impounded in 2008 and sold at auction by the Canadian Government in 2009
- Owner: Green Ship LLC
- Acquired: November 2009
- Identification: IMO number: 5172602
- Status: Retrofit for Pacific Gyre studies; abandoned due to financial difficulties
- Owner: Tracy Dodds
- Acquired: March 2013
- Identification: IMO number: 5172602
- Fate: Purchased for demolition
- Status: Laid up at Shelburne NS

General characteristics
- Tonnage: 648 gross register tons (GRT)
- Displacement: 657 long tons (668 t)
- Length: 52.4 m (172 ft)
- Beam: 9.3 m (31 ft)
- Ice class: Yes
- Installed power: 1,400 hp (1,000 kW)
- Propulsion: Variable-pitch propeller
- Speed: 10 kts

RV Farley Mowat was a long-range, ice class ship. Originally built as a Norwegian fisheries research and enforcement vessel, she was purchased by the Sea Shepherd Conservation Society in Edinburgh, Scotland, in August 1996. Originally named Sea Shepherd III, the name was changed in 1999 to Ocean Warrior, before eventually being renamed in 2002 after Canadian writer Farley Mowat.

She was the flagship of Sea Shepherd's fleet until seized by the Canadian Department of Fisheries and Oceans off the coast of Newfoundland in April 2008. She was sold for Can$5,000 by court order in November 2009 to Green Ship LLC, a company headquartered in Oregon. During 2010, she was moored in Lunenburg, Nova Scotia, undergoing refit for operation as an expedition vessel for research in the Atlantic and Pacific Oceans. However, by 2011, the ship was on the market again to cover unpaid docking fees and was eventually sold in March 2013. The vessel, stripped of her superstructure having been purchased for scrap, sank at her berth at Shelburne, Nova Scotia in June 2015 and was subsequently raised. The vessel remained laid up at Shelburne until July 2017, when the hulk was taken away to be broken up.

== Career ==
The Sea Shepherd Conservation Society used the vessel to monitor international waters for violations of international fisheries agreements. Farley Mowat officially began her career in the waters off Costa Rica, immersed in controversy over policing actions against illegal fishing activities.

In March and April 2008, Farley Mowat was involved in controversy related to the 2008 Canadian commercial seal hunt. On 12 April 2008, Fisheries and Oceans Canada seized Farley Mowat in the Cabot Strait after the ship came near the seal hunt without an observation permit and two collisions with a coast guard vessel occurred. During the raid, the captain and first officer were arrested and later charged for the incident.

While seized, Farley Mowat was held by Fisheries and Oceans Canada at Sydney, Nova Scotia until put up for sale. The location of the ship at the time of the seizure is controversial. The Sea Shepherd Conservation Society claims the ship was seized illegally in international waters. The Canadian Fisheries minister claims that the ship was seized in Canadian waters, but also that the Fisheries Act gave him authority to order the boarding outside Canada's territorial waters zone of 12 nautical miles (22 km).

The captain and first officer made a court appearance on 1 May 2008. On 2 July 2008, they entered a plea of not guilty to coming too close to sealers. Convicted in absentia in June 2009 on two counts each of approaching within 926 metres (0.575 mi) of a seal hunt, the pair were sentenced on 10 September 2009 to fines totaling Can$45,000.

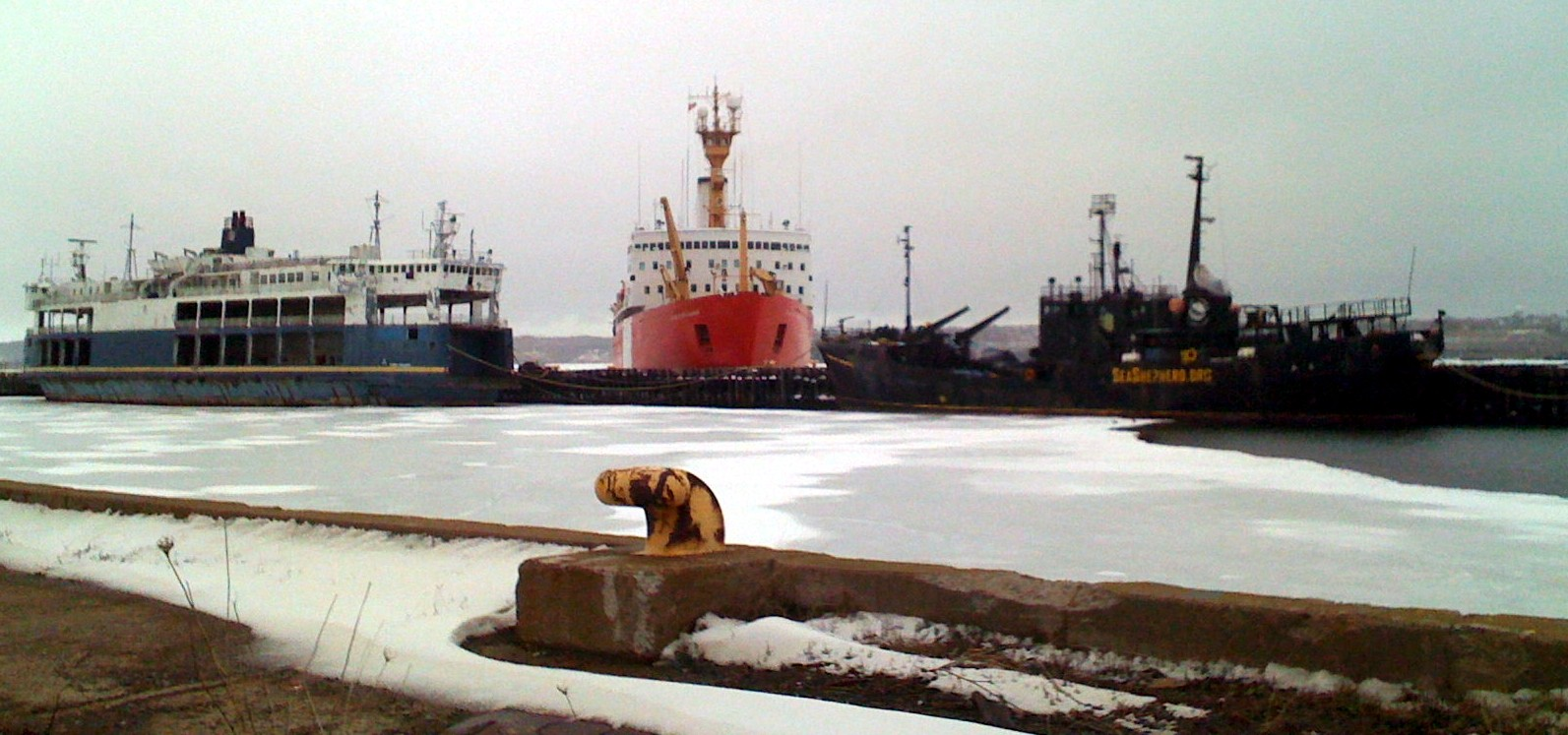
MV Fundy Paradise, CCGS Louis S. St-Laurent, RV Farley Mowat, Sydport Nova Scotia, March 2009

On 27 February 2009, the Canadian Crown-in-Council announced that Farley Mowat was being put up for sale to cover approximately Can$500,000 in berthing fees accrued since the April 2008 seizure. Subsequently, Farley Mowat was reportedly sold for Can$50,000, but the buyer did not complete the transaction. As of September 2009 the ship was still in the possession of the Canadian government and continued to accrue berthing fees. Sea Shepherd later stated that the seizure of the ship had been expected and, in fact, encouraged. Therefore, she had been used in provocation, with the full intention to have the Canadian government end up with, in their opinion, a more or less worthless vessel.

Farley Mowat arrived in Halifax on 18 December 2009 for refit and was towed to Lunenburg, Nova Scotia where she was tied up as of February 2010. It was reported in November 2009 that the vessel has been sold for the sum of Can$5,000 to the Green Ship LLC subsidiary of Stephen Munson's organization Tenthmil to be used in a survey of the North Pacific Gyre. As of August 2010, Farley Mowat remained berthed in Lunenburg, Nova Scotia for a refit under the direction of Cliff Hodder. In early 2013, with unpaid docking fees on the order of Can$90,000 and Green Ship LLC apparently in Chapter 11 bankruptcy proceedings, the ship was sold at a sheriff's auction to an undisclosed buyer. The buyer was later identified as Tracy Dodds of Eastern Scrap and Demolition Services, a Halifax-based company; the purchase price was Can$9,200. The vessel sat in Lunenburg for several months, during which the superstructure was removed, before being evicted by the Lunenburg Waterfront Development Corporation for non-payment of docking fees. In early September 2013, Farley Mowat was towed to Shelburne, Nova Scotia, on the way to Meteghan, Nova Scotia, where she would be scrapped.

On 24 June 2015, Farley Mowat sank at her berth and came to rest on the bottom of the harbour. The vessel was subsequently refloated and 2,000 litres (440 imp gal; 530 US gal) of pollutants were removed, with the Canadian Coast Guard incurring costs of some Can$815,000. Owner Tracy Dodds was found to be in contempt of court for failing to remove the vessel or pay Can$10,000 in penalties and fees. On 3 August 2016, Dodds was arrested in Wolfville, Nova Scotia on contempt charges and subsequently served 20 days in jail.

As of 29 December 2016, the hulk of Farley Mowat remained docked in Shelburne, with over Can$130,000 in docking fees owing. In June 2017, the Canadian Coast Guard informed Shelburne city staff that the vessel would be removed in the following weeks to be broken up. On 26 July 2017, the hulk was towed away by Atlantic Towing under contract from the Canadian Coast Guard to be broken up at Liverpool, Nova Scotia.

== Registration ==
Farley Mowat registered under the Canadian flag in April 2002. In October of the same year, the government suspended her registration. The complete record of registration is unclear, but the latest record under Canadian Vessel Registration Query System is closing on 20 November 2006.

The United Kingdom revoked the ship's registration in early December 2006; the same day it was issued. Sea Shepherd then received registration for her in Belize on 19 December 2006. Ten days later, on 29 December 2006, Farley Mowat cleared Australian Customs in Hobart, Tasmania, only hours before Belize struck her flag.

During 2007, the ship operated without an officially recognised registration flag. In May 2007, Sea Shepherd issued a press release stating that the Mohawk long house of the Iroquois Confederacy, in response to the Canadian government action, had agreed to the ship (and Sea Shepherd's other ship Robert Hunter) flying their flag. It was not clear if this was recognised as a registration by port authorities as the body is not internationally recognised as a country.

The vessel was registered in the Netherlands in 2008.

== Successor ==
In January 2015, Sea Shepherd USA purchased two recently decommissioned U.S. Coast Guard 110-foot (34 m) Island-class patrol boats, one of which has been christened the MY Farley Mowat.

== In popular culture ==
- The vessel is featured in the 2007 film Sharkwater.
- She is featured in Eco-Pirate: The Story of Paul Watson, a biopic on Paul Watson's life as an activist.
- The 2008 documentary At the Edge of the World features the ship during Operation Leviathan in the Antarctic in early 2007.
- The ship is in the final minutes of S1E2 of the TV show Haven.
