= Sea Shepherd I =

Former English fishing trawler

History
- Owner: Sea Shepherd Conservation Society
- Port of registry: United Kingdom
- Acquired: 1978
- Identification: IMO number: 5388043
- Fate: Scuttled December 1979

General characteristics
- Type: Fishing trawler

Sea Shepherd I was a former fishing trawler owned by the Sea Shepherd Conservation Society. She was British-registered and acquired in 1978 with a grant from the Fund for Animals. This was the first ship that the Sea Shepherd Conservation Society bought. Her major action was ramming into the whaler MV Sierra and she later was scuttled by the captain, Paul Watson.
