= The Outlaw Ocean =

2019 book about maritime crime

- First edition
- Author: Ian Urbina
- Language: English
- Subject: Crime; marine conservation; maritime law; law of the sea; illegal fishing; piracy; human trafficking
- Genre: True crime Investigative journalism
- Published: 2019 (Knopf); 2020 (Vintage Publishing)
- Publication place: United States
- Media type: Print
- Pages: 560

The Outlaw Ocean: Journeys Across the Last Untamed Frontier (also published as The Outlaw Ocean: Crime and Survival in the Last Untamed Frontier) is a 2019 book by Ian Urbina about crime and extralegal activity in international waters. The book was based on an investigate journalism series Urbina wrote for The New York Times. Topics covered include illegal, unreported and unregulated fishing, modern slavery and violent crime committed at sea, as well of the work of organisations, governments and companies in international waters. The book was critically acclaimed.

== Synopsis ==
The Outlaw Ocean is structured as a series of essays about lawlessness at sea with each chapter covering a different aspect and case studies. Urbina describes his experiences of their reporting. These include:

- The Thunder, an illegal fishing vessel that was part of the Bandit 6, and its pursuit by the Sea Shepherd Conservation Society
- Maritime law enforcement against illegal fishing in Palau and Indonesia
- The Principality of Sealand, an unrecognised micronation and former pirate radio station off the coast of Suffolk
- Women on Waves, an NGO that provides abortions in international waters for women in countries where they are illegal
- Stowaways in international shipping
- A Greenpeace and academic expedition by the MV Esperanza to survey the Amazon Reef in advance of plans to drill the region for oil.
- Poor working conditions and modern slavery in the fishing industry, particularly in Thailand
- Violent crime at sea, including an investigation of a clip showing a murder at sea committed by a longliner crew
- Piracy off the coast of Somalia

== Reception ==
It was reviewed positively in The Guardian, New Statesman, NPR and The New York Times. It also entered The New York Times Best Seller list in September 2019.

Urbina's reporting adapted for the book won numerous awards as a New York Times series.

== Adaptations ==
The book is accompanied by a musical project, The Outlaw Ocean Music Project, which involved around 200 musicians sampling field recordings from the book's research trips and creating a soundtrack.

Urbina also established The Outlaw Ocean Project, a non-profit journalism organisation to produce further stories about maritime crime.

A film adaptation of Urbina's reporting is in development by Netflix, set to be produced by Leonardo DiCaprio.

In 2022 CBC Radio and the LA Times released a seven-part podcast called The Outlaw Ocean, featuring Urbina's reportage.
