= Viarsa 1 =

History
- Port of registry: Uruguay
- Fate: Scrapped December 2007

General characteristics
- Type: fishing vessel

Viarsa 1 was a Uruguayan-flagged fishing vessel famous for its involvement in a high seas chase.

== Chase ==
On 7 August 2003, Australian Customs and Fisheries patrol vessel Southern Supporter spotted Viarsa 1 in Australian territorial waters near Heard Island. Suspecting the vessel of illegal fishing for toothfish, the Australians ordered the crew to stop. They fled, and this began a chase that would last for three weeks. The pair of vessels faced huge seas and numerous icebergs, and the rivalry was briefly suspended when the fishermen became lost in Antarctic sea ice and were directed to safety by the Australian sailors.

As the chase progressed across thousands of nautical miles of ocean, Southern Supporter was joined by the South African salvage tug John Ross and polar icebreaker SAS Agulhas and Falkland Islands-based British fisheries patrol boat Dorada. On 28 August, after 3,900 nautical miles (7,200 km), the contingent, led by Australian Customs Officer Steve Duffy, surrounded Viarsa 1 2,000 nautical miles (2,000 mi; 4,000 km) south-west of Cape Town, South Africa.

Meanwhile, a steaming party of Australian personnel flew to South Africa and boarded the oiler SAS Drakensberg, which met the other ships on 3 September. Southern Supporter and Viarsa 1 arrived in Fremantle, Western Australia, on 3 October. Viarsa 1 captain Ricardo Mario Ribot Cabrera and his four shipmates posted bail and were ordered to remain close by and await legal proceedings. They found lodging at a hostel for merchant seamen.

It was the longest chase of an ocean poacher in history until the Sea Shepherd vessels Bob Barker and Sam Simon intercepted the Nigerian-flagged trawler Thunder, also a toothfish poacher, and pursued her from December 2014 to April 2015 as part of Sea Shepherd's "Operation Icefish" campaign.

== Trial ==
Despite the 97 tonnes of toothfish found on board the vessel, representatives for the owners of Viarsa 1 secured an acquittal by jury in November 2005. After two trials and two years, the seamen were free to return to their home countries.

== Salvage ==
According to the environmental advocacy group Oceana, Viarsa 1 was scrapped at an Indian shipyard.

== Sources and external links ==
- "Operational updates". Southern Ocean Operation. Australian Customs and Border Protection Service. 3 October 2003. Archived from the original on 25 August 2004.
- Spencer, LCDR Graham; Dunn, LEUT Matt. "Navy returns Viarsa to Aussie waters". Navy News.
- "Viarsa captain praises justice system". ninemsn. Australian Associated Press. 7 November 2005. Archived from the original on 5 June 2011.
- Knecht, G. Bruce (2006). Hooked: Pirates, Poaching, and the Perfect Fish. Rodale Books. ISBN 9781594861109.
- Pastor, Xavier (5 February 2008). "Oceana: The end of pirate fishing vessel Viarsa 1". Fish Update.

Specific
