= Bandit 6 =

Illegal fishing group

The Bandit 6 was a group of six vessels which were illegally fishing Patagonian toothfish in the Southern Ocean. Actions by the Sea Shepherd Conservation Society and national governments resulted in all six vessels being detained or sunk.

== Background ==
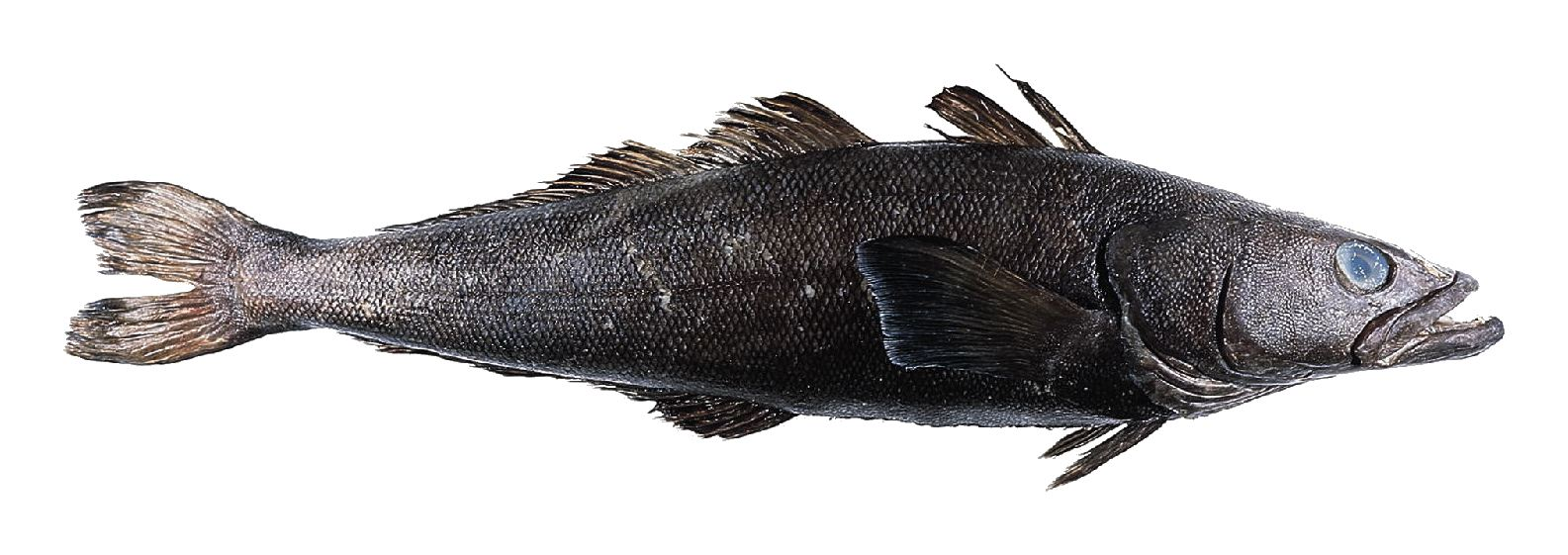
Patagonian toothfish

Patagonian toothfish and the related Antarctic toothfish are relatives of cod that are sold under the name "Chilean Sea Bass." Illegal fishing vessels like the Bandit 6 do not report their catch, violating the regulations set by the Commission for the Conservation of Antarctic Marine Living Resources. They often also use banned, environmentally damaging fishing methods such as gill nets.

In November 2014, Sea Shepherd launched Operation Icefish, a campaign against illegal, unreported and unregulated (IUU) fishing in the Southern Ocean. Six vessels in particular had been operating illegally for over ten years; Sea Shepherd dubbed these vessels the "Bandit 6." The six ships were Kunlun, Perlon, Songhua, Thunder, Viking, and Yongding. Four of the ships, Kunlun, Songhua, Viking and Yongding had at one point been owned by Vidal Armadores, a Spanish company associated with toothfish poaching.

== Operations against the Bandit Six ==
In December 2014, the Sea Shepherd vessels MV Bob Barker and MY Sam Simon sailed to the Southern Ocean in search of the Bandit Six. On 17 December the Bob Barker spotted the Thunder and began chasing it. Three of the boats, Kunlun, Songhua and Yongding, were spotted and stopped by the New Zealand Navy patrol vessel HMNZS Wellington. The crews claimed that the three ships were registered in Equatorial Guinea, but the government of Equatorial Guinea said that this was not true. Interpol purple notices were issued out for all three vessels at the request of the New Zealand government. The crews refused to allow their vessels to be boarded, and weather conditions meant that the Wellington could not force a boarding. The Wellington's crew gathered information about the vessels and the patrol boat returned to port. On 2 February 2015, the Sam Simon spotted Yongding and Kunlun, and pursued Kunlun for eight days, driving it out of the fishing grounds and collecting nets the Kunlun left behind, which the Sam Simon delivered to Mauritius. In March, the Kunlun arrived at Phuket, Thailand, with 182 tons of toothfish on board, which the crew of the Kunlun tried to offload as grouper; Thai authorities detained the ship. Also in March, the Viking was detained by Malaysia, but was later released after paying $71,500 in fines.

Meanwhile, the Bob Barker (later joined by the Sam Simon) was still pursuing the Thunder. The chase covered over 10,000 nautical miles and lasted 110 days, the longest pursuit of an illegal fishing boat on record. On 6 April, the Thunder's captain radioed a distress call, claiming the vessel had collided with something. The Sea Shepard vessels moved to assist, and all 40 of the Thunder's crew were rescued. Three Sea Shepherd crew boarded the Thunder and reported that cabin doors on the vessel had been tied open. This combined with the lack of evidence for a collision and the fact that the Thunder's crew cheered as the ship sank led the Sea Shepherd crews to believe that the Thunder had been intentionally scuttled to hide evidence of illegal fishing.

On 22 April 2015, the Perlon was spotted and boarded by Australian Customs and Border Protection Service and Australian Defence Force officials. The Australian Fisheries Management Authority alerted other governments in the area about the Perlon, and when the ship arrived in Malaysia in May, it was detained. The crew of the Perlon were later fined $445,000 and ordered to forfeit the cargo, valued at approximately $1.3 million.

On 19 May, Peter Hammarstedt, captain of the MV Bob Barker, was on sabbatical in Mindelo, Cape Verde, when he noticed a familiar-looking ship had arrived at the port. He took a photo of the ship and forwarded it to New Zealand authorities, who confirmed that the ship was the Songhua. The Songhua was joined the next day by the Yongding, and on 21 May both were boarded and detained by Cape Verde port authorities.

In September 2015, the Kunlun escaped from Phuket. The Phuket authorities had allowed the Kunlun to refuel so that it could keep its cargo frozen. The Kunlun was next seen in Senegal in early February 2016, claiming to be registered in Indonesia. Senegalese authorities detained the ship.

The Sea Shepherd flagship MV Steve Irwin searched for the last of the Bandit 6, Viking. When the MV Steve Irwin located the ship, they alerted the Indonesian authorities. On 25 February 2016, the Indonesian Navy seized the Viking near Tanjung Berakit, Riau Islands province. On 14 March, the Viking was destroyed by Indonesian authorities.

== See also ==
- Sea Shepherd Conservation Society operations
