= Heard Island and McDonald Islands Marine Reserve =

- The protected zones of the Heard Island and McDonald Islands Marine Reserve
- Location: Heard Island and McDonald Islands, Australia
- Coordinates: 53.075°S 73.500°E
- Area: 379,070 km^{2} (146,360 sq mi)
- Established: October 2002

The Heard Island and McDonald Islands Marine Reserve is a protected area covering the majority of the Heard Island and McDonald Islands territory. The territory, governed as an external territory of Australia, includes the named islands as well as their surrounding territorial waters and exclusive economic zone (EEZ). The marine reserve is divided into three zones with different protection levels. The most protected zone fully encompasses the islands and their territorial waters, as well as areas of the surrounding ocean with representative biological communities. The two other zones cover different parts of the EEZ.

Heard Island and the McDonald Islands are remote islands in the southern Indian Ocean. They are parts of the mostly submerged Kerguelen Plateau, along with the French Kerguelen Islands to the northwest. Heard Island was discovered in 1853, and the McDonald Islands the year after. Seal hunting took place on Heard Island for the next two decades. The islands came under Australian control in 1947. The surrounding ocean was heavily fished by the Soviet Union from the 1960s. In 1979, Australia declared that waters within 200 nautical miles (370 km; 230 mi) of the islands were part of the Australian Fishing Zone, providing them some protection from international fishing. In 1987, Australia legislated to protect the islands and their territorial waters. Commercial fishing of Patagonian toothfish and mackerel icefish in the EEZ began in 1997.

Discussion about creating a marine reserve began around the turn of the century. Following consultations among government, researchers, and the fishing industry, the Heard Island and McDonald Islands Marine Reserve was established in October 2002. This reserve incorporated the islands and their already protected surrounding waters, as well as representative areas of ocean to the north and northeast. Fishing was banned in the reserve, which was slightly expanded in 2014. In 2025, the reserve was expanded again, now encompassing most of the territory. However, the newly included areas were given a level of protection that permits some commercial activities. The fisheries are monitored for sustainability, and illegal fishing has not been observed since 2005.

The seafloor encompassed by the reserve is geologically varied, creating distinct ecological habitats. The oceans are highly productive, supporting marine animals as well as the seabirds and marine mammals that breed on Heard Island. Benthic communities vary along a roughly east–west axis. Management of the reserve is difficult due to the territory's remote location, and relies in large part upon cooperation with the fishing companies. Research of the territory has also been limited. There is some research and management cooperation with neighbouring France. The territory's remoteness has also protected it from most human impact. Visits are rare, and the islands host very few invasive species.

== History ==
=== Early history ===
Two decades of seal hunting took place on Heard Island shortly following its discovery.

Heard Island was discovered in 1853, and the McDonald Islands in 1854. The first landing on Heard Island took place in 1855. Around 100 ships visited the island for seal hunting until 1877. The island had produced about one hundred thousand barrels of seal oil. Southern elephant seals may have survived in limited numbers, but Antarctic fur seals only started breeding on Heard Island again in the 1960s.

After being claimed by the United Kingdom in 1910, the islands became an Australian territory in 1947. Environmental protection was not a priority during this period, although Australia did claim territorial waters around the islands. An Australian scientific research station was maintained on Heard Island from 1947 until 1955, when focus shifted to the new Mawson Station in Antarctica. Despite their remote location and rough seas, the territory was occasionally visited for hunting and fishing. The Soviet Union began fishing above the Kerguelen Plateau in the late 1960s, continuing until the expansion of the Australian maritime claim.

The waters around the Heard and McDonald Islands first became protected in 1979, when 200 nautical miles of surrounding waters (aside from where this would have entered the jurisdiction of the French Kerguelen Islands) were included in the newly created Australian Fishing Zone (AFZ). Management of the AFZ was later altered by the Fisheries Management Act 1991. In 1994, Australia ratified the United Nations Convention on the Law of the Sea, and the waters of the AFZ became congruent with the exclusive economic zone of the territory.

A researcher among penguins in 1955

In 1980, Australia signed the Convention on the Conservation of Antarctic Marine Living Resources (CCAMLR), which came into effect in 1982 and encompassed the Heard and McDonald Islands. The Antarctic Marine Living Resources Conservation Act 1981 applied CCAMLR in Australian law. In 1983, the islands were added to the Register of the National Estate, giving them a protected heritage status. The Heard Island and McDonald Islands Environment Protection and Management Ordinance 1987 explicitly aimed to "protect the environment and the indigenous wildlife of the Territory", and restricted entry to the islands and their territorial sea. The ordinance banned the unauthorised bringing of organisms to the territory, as well as the unauthorised removal of organisms from the territory. A lot of debris from the abandoned scientific station was removed in the 1980s. An automatic weather station was installed in 1990.

The 1987 ordinance also created the requirement for a management plan for the islands, although one was not created until 1995. Pursuant to this plan, the Heard Island Wilderness Reserve was created under the jurisdiction of the Australian Antarctic Division (AAD). This reserve included the territorial waters. In 1990, Australia sought to have the territory declared a World Heritage Site. The site was listed in 1997, in part due to its unique wildlife. The 12 nautical miles (22 km; 14 mi) of territorial waters were included in the listing, and fishing was further banned in a 1 nautical mile (1.9 km; 1.2 mi) buffer zone around this. In total, 370 square kilometres (140 sq mi) of land was protected, along with 6,220 square kilometres (2,400 sq mi) of sea. The World Heritage Area was added to Australia's National Heritage List in 2007.

Trawl surveys in 1990, 1992, and 1993 provided an initial assessment of mackerel icefish and Patagonian toothfish presence. Regular commercial fishing for both species began in 1997, although it was prohibited in the territorial waters and their surrounding buffer zone. Fishing was initially carried out through trawling. After the introduction of longline fishing in 2003, Patagonian toothfish fishing shifted towards that method. By the mid-2010s, trawling was rarely used for toothfish. As longline fishing reaches deeper waters, it tends to catch larger toothfish. Fish traps began to see use in small numbers from 2009. Trawling is still used to catch mackerel icefish.

=== Planning ===
The waters around the Heard and McDonald Islands were one of five priority areas for inclusion in a new National Representative System of Marine Reserves, created following Australia's signing of the 1992 Convention on Biological Diversity. The creation of such reserves was made possible through the Environment Protection and Biodiversity Conservation Act 1999. This act also linked domestic Australian protections with the IUCN protected area categories. The 1991 fisheries management act and the 1999 environmental protection act remain the underlying legislation through which the Heard Island and McDonald Islands Marine Reserve is managed.

Biological data relating to the territory at this time was limited, and especially so beyond the territorial waters. Some data was available on demersal fish and echinoderms from surveys carried out by the Aurora Australis in the 1990s. Many samples taken during the existence of the research station were never studied in detail. An annual demersal fish survey began in 1997, carried out by commercial vessels and aimed at assessing fish stocks in waters up to 1,000 metres (3,300 ft) deep. These benthic trawl surveys are carried out in partnership with the AAD and AFMA.

An initial marine reserve proposal was released in 2000. For the purposes of consultation, the HIMI Stakeholder Group was created, bringing together the Australian Antarctic Division, fishing industry representatives, and non-governmental organisations. The group reached a general agreement on the initial proposal, but disputes over four areas (Aurora Bank, part of the Western Trough, part of the Northeastern Plateau, and part of Shell Bank) led to these being designated as "conservation zones" rather than full parts of the marine reserve. The conservation zone designation provided a temporary level of protection, pending assessment of whether such areas should be fully or partially incorporated into the reserve.

=== Establishment ===
The borders of the Heard Island and McDonald Islands Marine Reserve in 2002, along with "conservation zones" designated for future research

The formal proposal was laid in 2001, and the Heard Island and McDonald Islands Marine Reserve was officially designated in October 2002. At 65,000 square kilometres (25,000 sq mi), it was at the time the world's largest marine protected area. (It was later surpassed by the Great Barrier Reef Marine Park, Chagos Marine Protected Area, and South Orkney Islands Southern Shelf Marine Protected Area.) Fishing was banned in the reserve, although some fishing still occurred in the conservation zones. The reserve was designed to include parts of all biophysical features, as well as connecting pathways between them.

The new reserve was notable for the cooperation between government, scientists, and industry in its establishment. It was primarily focused on areas shallower than 1,000 metres (3,300 ft), in part because these were the areas for which more information was available. The government and fisheries industry conducted further joint research in the years following the reserve's establishment. This research suggested the reserve contained representative samples of the different benthic communities of the territory. The first dedicated research survey took place across 2003 and 2004. This saw research on the interactions between land-based predators and the marine ecosystem, as well as research into mesopelagic fish. Many benthic surveys in the years immediately following the reserve's establishment were targeted at the conservation zones, to determine what areas should be added to the reserve proper.

The RV Aurora Australis brought scientists to Heard Island in 2008. A tourist ship visited the area in 2012, carrying some scientists. RV Investigator brought researchers in 2015 and 2016, although there were no landings on the island. 2016 saw the most recent private landing on the island. RV Investigator made another research trip in 2020, again with no landings.

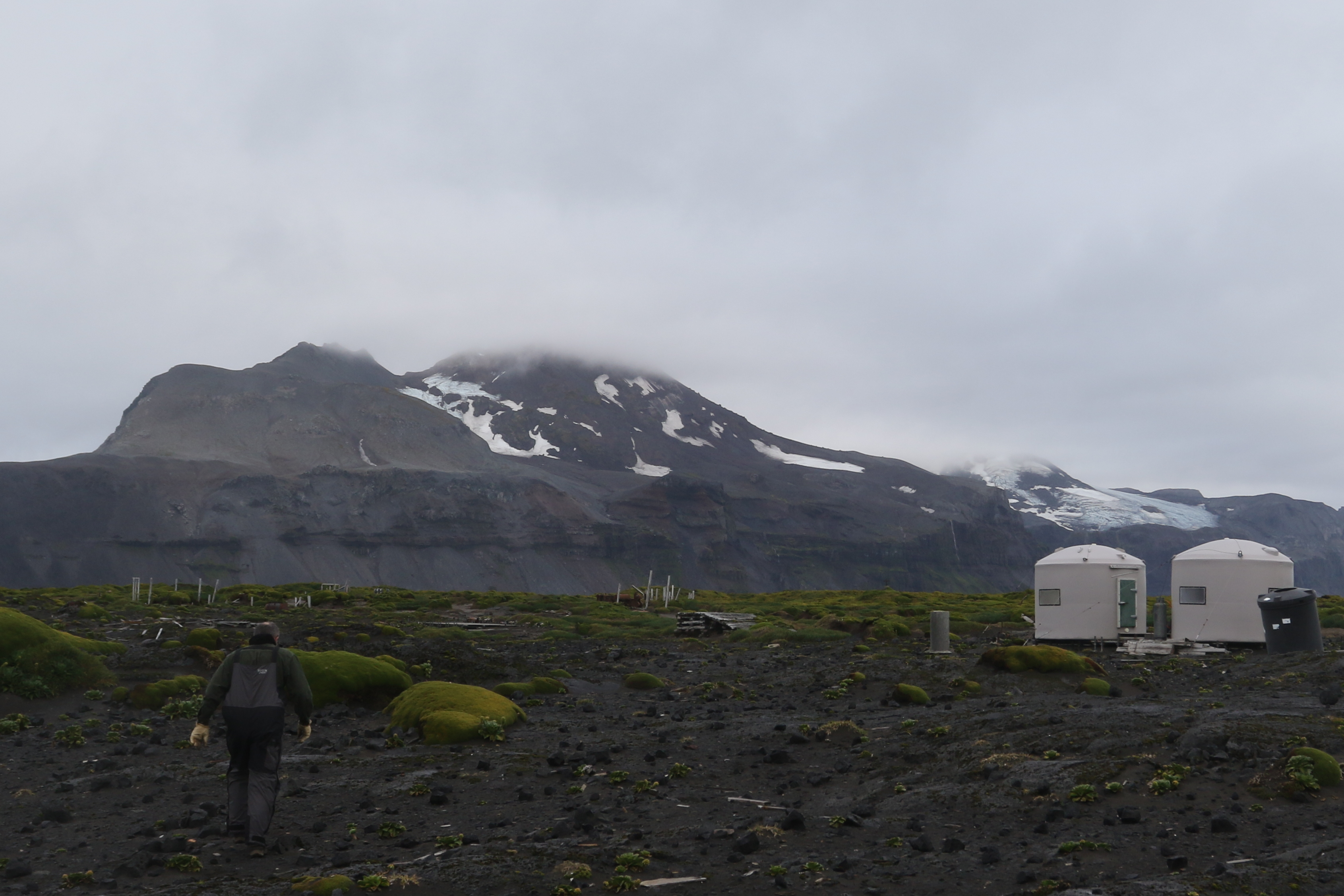
A research station on Heard Island's Atlas Cove in 2016

The first management plan, which had come into effect on 24 August 2005, expired on 23 August 2012. In March 2014, the reserve was expanded to 71,000 square kilometres (27,000 sq mi), or 17% of the EEZ. This expansion incorporated 6,200 square kilometres (2,400 sq mi) of the formerly designated conservation zones, with the remaining conservation zone becoming a normal part of the fisheries zone. A new management plan was approved in October that year. A 2016 survey mapped 22% of the reserve's seafloor.

In 2023, the Australian government expanded the Macquarie Island Marine Park, and commissioned a scientific report which recommended a similar expansion for the Heard Island and McDonald Islands Marine Reserve. In early October, the government announced an expansion would occur. The 2014 management plan expired on 14 October 2024. On 5 December 2024, a legislative amendment to expand the reserve was signed, coming into effect on 24 January 2025. Absent a new management plan, transitional arrangements came into place following the expansion under which the approach of the previous plan would be observed until a new management plan was formulated. This expanded reserve was divided into multiple zones. The original reserve was maintained as a fully protected area at the level of IUCN Category I. The 310,000 square kilometres (120,000 sq mi) added to the reserve consisted of 140,000 square kilometres (54,000 sq mi) protected at an IUCN Category II level, and 170,000 square kilometres (66,000 sq mi) protected at an IUCN Category IV level.

The additions expanded the protected area of the territory by over 400%, and brought the total percentage of Australian waters with some sort of protection to 52%. The different protection levels mean different restrictions apply in each zone. The areas in the expanded reserve, such as Williams Ridge, are protected from deep sea mining, but not from all commercial activities. The new zones included some areas that were already used for commercial fishing.

The AAD obtained the use of RSV Nuyina for two research trips in 2025. These trips had multiple research purposes, including checking for signs of avian influenza. This marked around 20 years since the previous major research effort carried out by the AAD in the territory.

== Geography ==
The Heard Island and McDonald Islands are an extremely remote territory, lying roughly 4,000 kilometres (2,500 mi) from Australia to the northeast and Africa to the northwest, and 1,700 kilometres (1,100 mi) north of Antarctica. To the northwest, the exclusive economic zone of Australia meets that of France created by the Kerguelen Islands. The total area of the Australian exclusive economic zone is 410,722 square kilometres (158,581 sq mi). The total area covered by the Heard Island and McDonald Islands Marine Reserve is 379,070 square kilometres (146,360 sq mi).

Both the Australian and French island groups lie on the 1,226,230 square kilometres (473,450 sq mi) Kerguelen Plateau, specifically in the northern portion. This plateau is a large igneous province. It is generally at least 2,000 metres (6,600 ft) above the surrounding seafloor, and less than 3,000 metres (9,800 ft) from the surface. The two island groups are separated by a 650-metre (2,130 ft) deep trough.

A number of currents flow across or around the plateau in a west-to-east direction. The Heard and McDonald Islands lie south of the northern arm of the polar front, leading to environmental differences between the territory and other subantarctic islands, including Kerguelen. The islands are also affected by the strong current flowing through the Fawn Trough, which includes the southern branch of the polar front. This makes Heard Island more Antarctic than the typically subantarctic Kerguelen. The seafloor around the Heard and McDonald Islands is also cooler than that around Kerguelen. These currents cause upwelling in various parts of the territory.

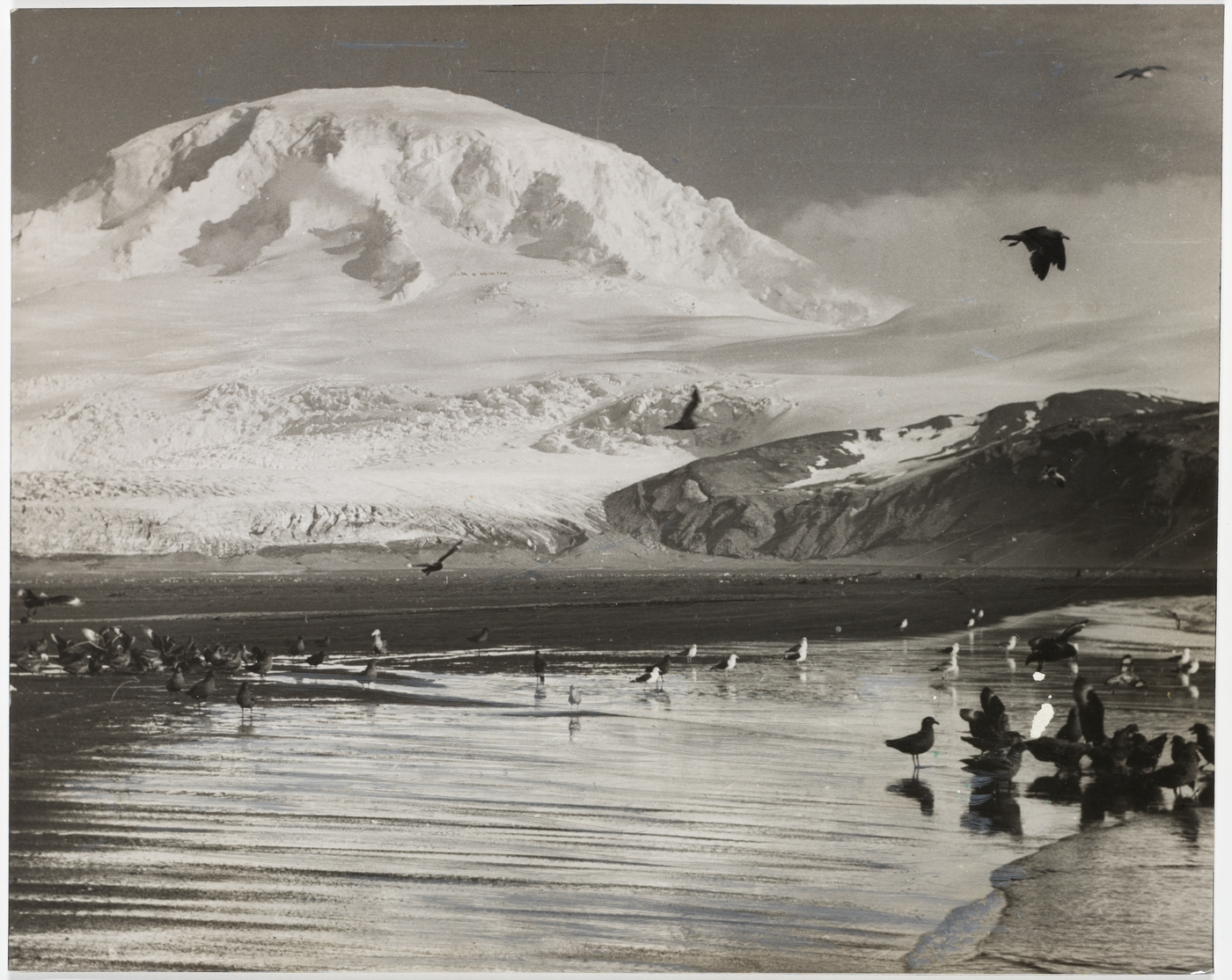
Much of Heard Island is glaciated, with these glaciers flowing from Big Ben, a central volcano. Terrestrial life congregates in the patches of coast without ice.

Heard Island is about 368 square kilometres (142 sq mi), while McDonald Island is 3 square kilometres (1.2 sq mi). The islands make up only 0.02% of the total area within the EEZ. These islands are volcanic. The Big Ben volcano of Heard Island reaches 2,745 metres (9,006 ft) above sea level. Around 70% of the island is covered in glaciers, although the glaciers are shrinking. McDonald Island is surrounded by smaller knolls. In total, the territory has seven islands. The average air temperature is 1 °C (34 °F), ranging from an average 0.1 °C (32.2 °F) in winter to 3.2 °C (37.8 °F) in summer. Annual rainfall, including snow, reaches 1.9 metres (6.2 ft).

The seabed of the territory can be divided into 12 distinct physical features: territorial waters, five ocean banks (Aurora, Coral, Discovery, Pike, and Shell), three oceanic plateaus (Northern, Northeastern, and Southern), two troughs (Eastern and Western), and deeper waters. The slopes between the immediate shelf and the deeper waters are quite steep, with descent usually starting from 500–1,000 metres (1,600–3,300 ft) below sea level. These deep waters border the shelf within the EEZ to the east, south, and west, although the Williams ridge runs southeast from Shell Bank out of the EEZ. The southern slopes are part of the Fawn Trough. Further south, outside the EEZ, the southern Kerguelen Plateau is part of Australia's continental shelf claim.

The Southern Plateau physical zone has two distinct benthic communities, and thus can be divided into an inner (near the islands) section and an outer section. Counting both parts of the Southern Plateau as separate units, 9 of the 13 biophysical units are either fully or partially within the strict reserve. Further research has led to the identification of possible smaller-scale ecological divisions within the larger features. Shell Bank has been posited as being part of the same landform as Williams Ridge.

Most of the shelf surrounding the islands is around 500 metres (1,600 ft). The territorial waters are generally no deeper than 300 metres (980 ft). The Aurora Bank, Coral Bank, Discovery Bank, and Pike Bank are known to be as shallow as 300 metres (980 ft), and Shell Bank is as shallow as at least 500 metres (1,600 ft). The Southern Plateau ranges from 200 metres (660 ft) to 500 metres (1,600 ft) deep. The Northern Plateau is around 500 metres (1,600 ft) deep, while the Northeastern Plateau ranges from that depth down to 750 metres (2,460 ft). To the south of the islands, the ocean floor slopes downwards very steeply. Most banks are covered in rocky sediment, although Shell Bank has unique "shelly" sedimentary deposits. The plateaus and deeper waters are often topped with sand and mud. The deeper waters are not extensively surveyed.

== Management ==
Patagonian toothfish fishery history in the territory (in tonnes)
Year	Legal catch						Illegal fishing estimate
Year	Longline fishing	Trawling	Fish traps	Total	Vessels	Catch limit	Illegal fishing estimate
1997	-	1808	-	1808	1	3800	7117
1998	-	2966	-	2966	3	3700	4150
1999	-	3341	-	3341	2	3690	427
2000	-	3030	-	3030	2	3585	1154
2001	-	2599	-	2599	2	2995	2004
2002	-	2514	-	2514	2	2815	3489
2003	286	2468	-	2754	3	2879	1274
2004	552	2327	-	2879	3	2873	531
2005	665	2266	-	2931	3	2787	265
2006	656	1769	72	2497	3	2584	74
2007	624	1714	-	2338	2	2427	0
2008	835	1445	-	2280	3	2500	0
2009	1164	1155	13	2332	3	2500	0
2010	1237	1135	31	2404	3	2550	0
2011	1381	1104	32	2517	3	2550	0
2012	1369	1302	-	2671	3	2730	-
2013	2149	563	41	2753	4	2730	-
2014	2646	107	-	2754	4	2730	-
2015	4062	205	-	4267	7	4410	-
2016	2624	158	-	2783	4	3405	-
2017	3345	24	-	3369	4	3405	-
2018	3083	53	-	3136	4	3525	-
2019	3334	68	-	3402	5	3525	-
2020	2895	119	-	3014	5	3030	-
2021	2891	99	4	2995	5	3030	-
2022	2698	68	-	2766	4	3010	-
2023	2406	70	-	2476	3	3010	-

Mackerel icefish fishery history in the territory (in tonnes)
Year	Catch	Vessels	Catch limit
1997	207	1	311
1998	104	3	900
1999	0	1	1160
2000	87	2	916
2001	1073	2	1150
2002	966	2	885
2003	2293	2	2980
2004	84	2	292
2005	1791	2	1864
2006	663	2	1210
2007	1	1	42
2008	199	1	220
2009	99	1	102
2010	365	1	1658
2011	1	1	78
2012	4	1	0
2013	644	1	679
2014	1123	1	1267
2015	10	2	309
2016	469	1	482
2017	543	1	561
2018	515	1	526
2019	443	1	443
2020	507	1	527
2021	403	2	406
2022	1024	3	1528
2023	336	1	2616

The remote location of the reserve creates challenges for monitoring and enforcement, with the cost of sending a patrol ship exceeding AU$2 million. McDonald Island has been officially visited only twice. Management is thus "passive": mostly undertaken remotely, or through cooperation with commercial fishing ships. Biosecurity procedures rely on self-regulation.

Commercial fishing companies were regularly consulted in the planning of the reserve, leading to the reserve having substantial industry support. The largest fishery is that of the Patagonian toothfish, with mackerel icefish caught in smaller amounts. The toothfish population was at about 82% of the estimated pre-fishing population in 2002. This decreased to 62% by 2012, although this level was still deemed sustainable. By 2025, the population was at 45% of unfished levels. If 20% is reached, the fishery is meant to close. Research suggests the territory's toothfish are part of a larger population extending across the Kerguelen Plateau and surrounding waters, leaving the territory's population vulnerable to fishing elsewhere. Some fishing takes place in areas of the Williams Ridge that extend beyond the Australian exclusive economic zone. Statistics from this fishing are included as part of population assessments.

The annual toothfish quota ranges from 2400 to 2800 tonnes. Two fishing companies hold toothfish quotas: Austral Fisheries holds 71% of the quota, while Australian Longline holds 29%. There are usually three or four fishing ships each season. Since the creation of the reserve, legal commercial fishing boats assist with site monitoring. Austral Fisheries, a member of the Coalition of Legal Toothfish Operators, invested heavily in IUU fishing detection after the creation of the reserve, receiving an award from the World Wildlife Fund in 2003. Both fishing companies participate in regular consultations with the Australian Fisheries Management Authority and the AAD. Some of this is through the Sub-Antarctic Management Advisory Committee. Data relating to demersal fish, which affects both fisheries, is used by the fishing companies and the government but not made public. The market value of fish caught in the territory is also not publicly disclosed.

The fishery has independent certification from the Marine Stewardship Council. Ships must abide by the reserve's regulations to maintain their Marine Stewardship Council certification. This was recertified in 2022. Fishing ships must carry two independent observers, paid for at company expense, who record information such as seabird interactions. Austral Fisheries (on behalf of both commercial companies) carries out a random stratified trawl survey in April and May each year, which is supported through in-kind contributions by the Australian Fisheries Management Authority. The Australian Antarctic Division provides a list of 160 survey sites, of which around 15-20% will be within the reserve. The fishing companies also tag and release some fish for research purposes. Over 70,000 toothfish were tagged from 1998 to 2020, of which 12,000 were recaptured. Deep-sea cameras have been used to assess the impact of fishing on the sea floor.

There is some bycatch from legal fishing, including of rays, sharks, and skates, with skates being the most common. The vulnerable Kerguelen skate is one of the species often caught. There are specific limits to the amount of legally permissible bycatch for these groups, as well as limits for unicorn icefish, grey rockcod, bigeye grenadiers, Caml grenadiers, Ridge scaled rattails and Whitson's grenadiers. There is also a general maximum allowable bycatch for other species. Smaller bycatch limits apply for individual hauls, which if exceeded bar further fishing within five nautical miles for five days or more.

Per the management plan, fishing ships are required to mitigate risks to migratory birds. Mitigation measures used by the industry include heavy weights for longline fishing, and keeping fishing effort to times of the day when seabirds are less common. The longlines sink as far as 2,000 metres (6,600 ft). The recorded number of annual seabird deaths ranges from 1 to 7.

The Heard and McDonald Islands are designated a strict nature reserve under the IUCN protected area categories system, covering 6,589 square kilometres (2,544 sq mi) of the islands and their surrounding territorial waters. Due to the remoteness of the territory, it has seen relatively few human impacts. Of waters shallower than 1,200 metres (3,900 ft), only 0.7% were affected by bottom fishing from 1997 to 2013, and only 1.5% of the biomass in these waters had been impacted by trawling. The islands have not seen the arrival of invasive species that nearby Kerguelen has.

The HIMI Marine Reserve Management Plan includes terrestrial restrictions. Researchers require specific permits. Tourism is restricted to specific zones, with tourists forbidden from approaching penguins. At sea, fishing ships are forbidden to enter the strict reserve except for the purposes of transit or approved research. By law, the management plan for the reserve must be reviewed every decade.

=== Threats ===
Illegal, unreported and unregulated fishing (IUU fishing) was common in the 1990s, leading to many icefish populations being overexploited. In the 2001–2002 season, illegally caught fish alone exceeded the total legal catch limits. Enforcement against IUU fishing made news in 2003 during the 21-day chase and apprehension of the Viarsa 1 fishing ship. No illegal fishing has been observed in the territory since 2005, although it has occurred nearby the EEZ and some abandoned fishing gear has been recovered within the EEZ.

Climate change has already changed the environment around the islands. However, the limited understanding of the current environment means that its expected long-term impact is hard to assess. Sea surface temperatures are thought to be increasing by 0.1 °C (32.2 °F) every decade, and to have risen between 0.6 °C (33.1 °F) and 1.0 °C (33.8 °F) since 1950. Marine heatwaves have become more common, while ocean acidification has increased by 30%. Different parts of the water column are warming at different rates, as well as at different speeds in different places. Glacial retreat on Heard Island has been observed at speeds of up to 50 metres (160 ft) in three years. Glacial coverage is thought to have been 80% in the 1940s and 64% in 2014.

Floating marine plastic pollution poses ingestion risks to local wildlife, including seabirds and seals. Plastic makes up 94% of the solid waste reaching Heard Island, much of which is fishing gear and plastic bottles. Plastic waste is less common at Heard Island than at other subantarctic islands.

=== International cooperation ===
Most of the wider fishery falls under the area covered by the Convention on the Conservation of Antarctic Marine Living Resources (CCAMLR) international convention, although a small section to the northeast is covered by the Southern Indian Ocean Fisheries Agreement. The Patagonian toothfish and mackerel icefish fisheries in the territory are the only fisheries using bottom trawling in the CCAMLR area. Total catch limits are in part informed by CCAMLR assessments. The territory, together with Kerguelen, is considered an important marine mammal area, and lies within the Indian Ocean Whale Sanctuary.

There is some cross-border cooperation with the French government, especially with regard to remote sensing. Cooperation agreements were signed between both countries in 2003 and 2007. These enable joint patrols between both countries on either's vessels. Fishing vessels around Kerguelen also use observers to monitor their activities. French data is made available through the French National Museum of Natural History, while Australian data is kept by the AAD.

== Wildlife ==
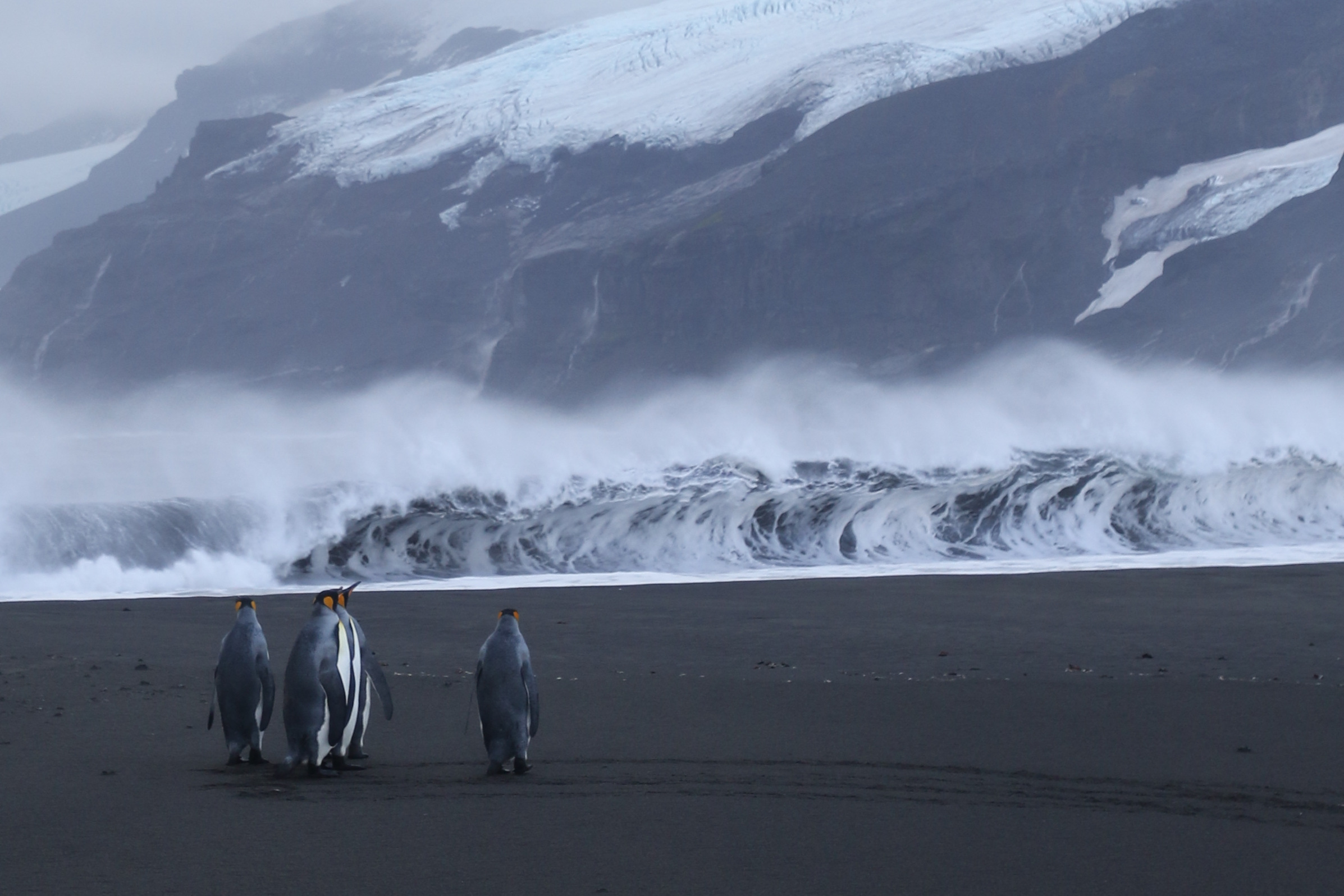
Animals such as king penguins feed in the rough waters around Heard Island.

The oceans near the Kerguelen Plateau host a productive community of phytoplankton, which supports the wider ecosystem. The phytoplankton that grow in the territory, benefitting from the relatively high availability of iron in the water, move east in a distinct plume. This plume extends beyond the EEZ, expanding the foraging habitat of predators as large as marine mammals from the seas around the islands to waters much further east. The areas of highest productivity are to the north and northeast of the islands, and the Eastern Trough; areas where iron is most available. These productive areas have high levels of diatoms, whereas areas with less iron have smaller plankton. The productive areas support larger zooplankton, with groups such as krill more common. There are also contributions to productivity by glacial meltwater and hydrothermal activity.

There are distinct deep-water and shelf zooplankton communities, with canyon communities more similar to shelf communities. Some species present in both communities, such as Rhincalanus gigas, are more abundant above the shelf. Species such as Themisto gaudichaudii are larger in deeper waters. The dominant krill species differ between deeper waters and those above the shelf.

Pelagic zone invertebrates are thought to be broadly similar to those in other sub-antarctic areas. Communities above the Kerguelen Plateau can be broadly divided into those in waters around 200–1,000 metres (660–3,280 ft) deep, and those in waters from 500–2,000 metres (1,600–6,600 ft) deep. They also fit within four geographically distinct food webs: northwest, south, the shelf, and the northeast.

A diverse range of cephalopods are known to predate smaller pelagic invertebrates, although most knowledge about them comes from dietary studies of predators higher in the food chain. Mesopelagic fish communities differ from those around Kerguelen, with species such as Krefftichthys anderssoni and Electrona antarctica more similar to those found in distant areas that are also south of the Polar front. Mesopelagic fish are more common in deeper waters than over the shelf.

Nearshore fish communities are broadly similar to those of other subantarctic islands, being dominated by Antarctic cods and crocodile icefishes. Deeper waters are dominated by Patagonian toothfish, macrourids, and skates, while lanternfish are most common in areas far from the islands. Fish species are often similar to those around Kerguelen, although some more usually Antarctic species have been caught. One classification of the plateau's fish divides them into seven distinct communities.

Etmopterus lantern sharks have mostly been found in the Northeastern Plateau. Air breathing predators seem to hunt more in some regions than others, being often seen around Shell Bank, the Northeastern Plateau, the Eastern Trough, and the inner Southern Plateau. This suggests this eastern area may be particularly important ecologically. Other sharks include the Portuguese dogfish, the southern sleeper shark, and the spiny dogfish. The sleeper shark is the largest fish found in the territory. There have been 19 cetacean species identified in the territory, including the dusky dolphin, fin whale, hourglass dolphin, orca, pygmy blue whale, Sei whale, spectacled porpoise, sperm whale, southern right whale, and southern right whale dolphin. The larger species are likely transitory, moving between the Antarctic and the northern part of the Kerguelen Plateau.

=== Benthic communities ===
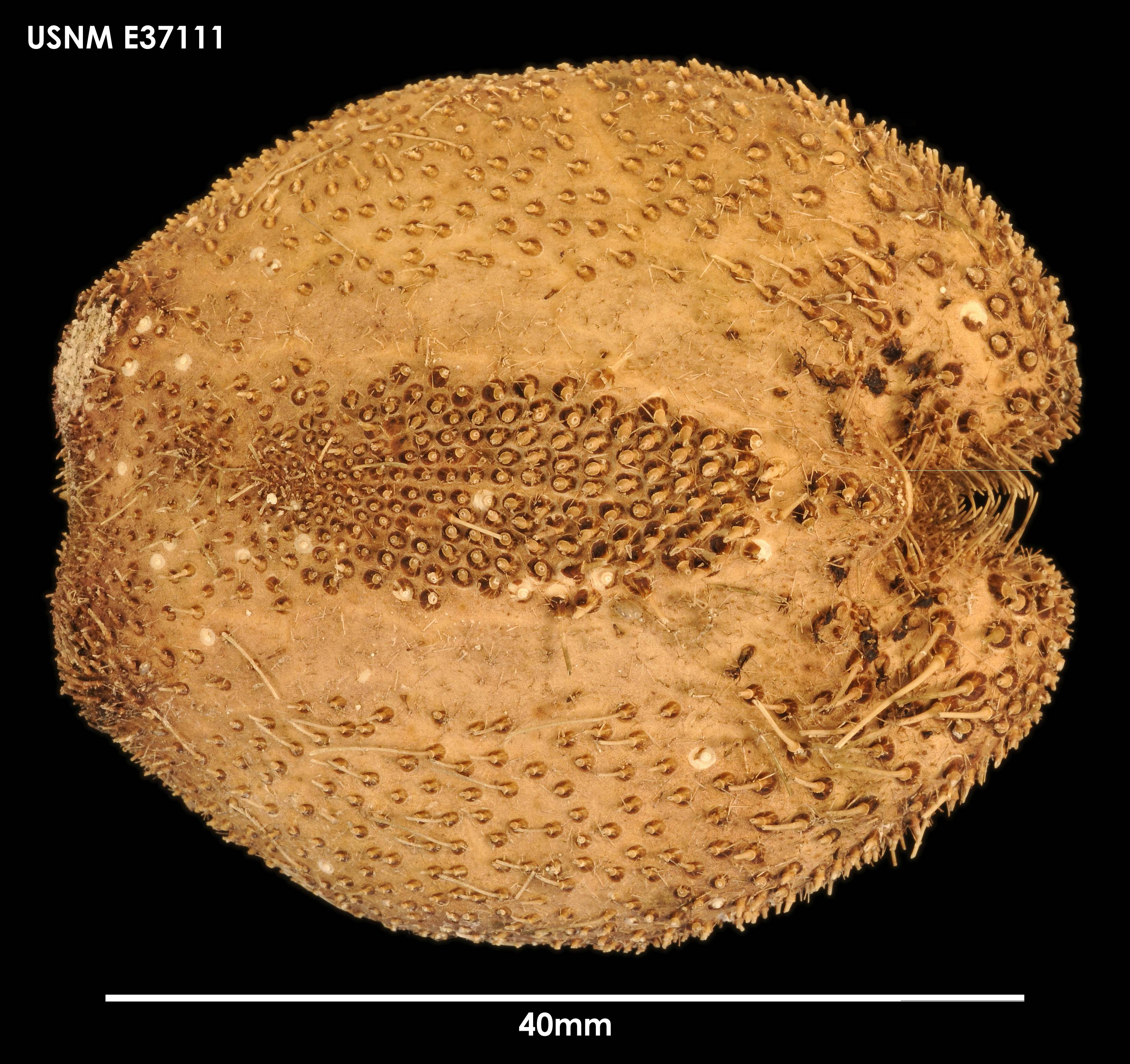
A Brisaster antarcticus sea urchin found near the McDonald Islands

At least 500 benthic taxa have been identified from waters shallower than 1,000 metres (3,300 ft). These communities vary roughly along an east–west axis. Many species are only found or mostly found in one particular physical zone. The Aurora and Coral Banks in the west host Bathylasma acorn barnacles and other species not found in other parts of the territory. The eastern Shell Bank is the only one with a large grey rockcod population, and has a distinct mackerel icefish population. Shell Bank also serves as a nursery habitat for Patagonian toothfish. Compared to the other banks, which show some similarities with at least one other, Shell Bank is ecologically distinct. Within the central shelf, there is a north–south variation in benthic wildlife.

The shallow waters directly around the islands, including nearshore environments and shallow plateau environments, have the highest overall biodiversity. The highest identified gastropod diversity is on Aurora Bank. Shell Bank has the most taxa endemic to only one physical feature within the territory. Idoteidae isopods have only been found in Shell Bank and the adjacent Northeastern Plateau. The inner and outer parts of the Southern Plateau have distinct benthic communities. Juvenile mackerel icefish are often found above the inner Southern Plateau, while juvenile Patagonian toothfish and adult Mackerel icefish are often found above the outer section.

Patagonian toothfish are thought to inhabit shallow waters near the islands of the Kerguelen Plateau as juveniles and move west and south into deeper waters as they age. Adult toothfish do not seem to travel much further than 50 kilometres (31 mi), so the population around the Heard and McDonald Islands may be ecologically distinct from Kerguelen's, although there is some movement and thus genetic transfer. Spawning in the western areas is likely the source of much of the population. There are two distinct mackerel icefish populations within the territory: one in waters above 350 metres (1,150 ft) around Heard Islandf and one at Shell Bank. The Shell Bank population is centred on the bank's eastern side. The two populations are not genetically distinct, however, they have ecological differences such as different spawning times. The size of the overall population has varied over time, for unclear reasons. There are perhaps six other Channichthys icefish that inhabit the territory (the species are not well-defined). The territory is also important for the Patagonian moray cod and Zanclorhynchus spinifer.

The seabed environment of the northern Kerguelen Plateau shares broad similarities with other subantarctic islands, such as South Georgia. However, its varied geography is suspected to have created conditions for the evolution of numerous endemic species. There are some species endemic to the waters around Heard Island specifically, although many species are endemic to Kerguelen and Heard. Species endemic to the wider northern plateau include the Abatus cordatus sea urchin, two spiny plunderfishes, Paraliparis operculosus, Lycenchelys hureau, and three Bathyraja skate species. The number of known endemic species is likely to be a significant underestimate due to the geographical context and the lack of research.

=== Terrestrial and semi-terrestrial ===
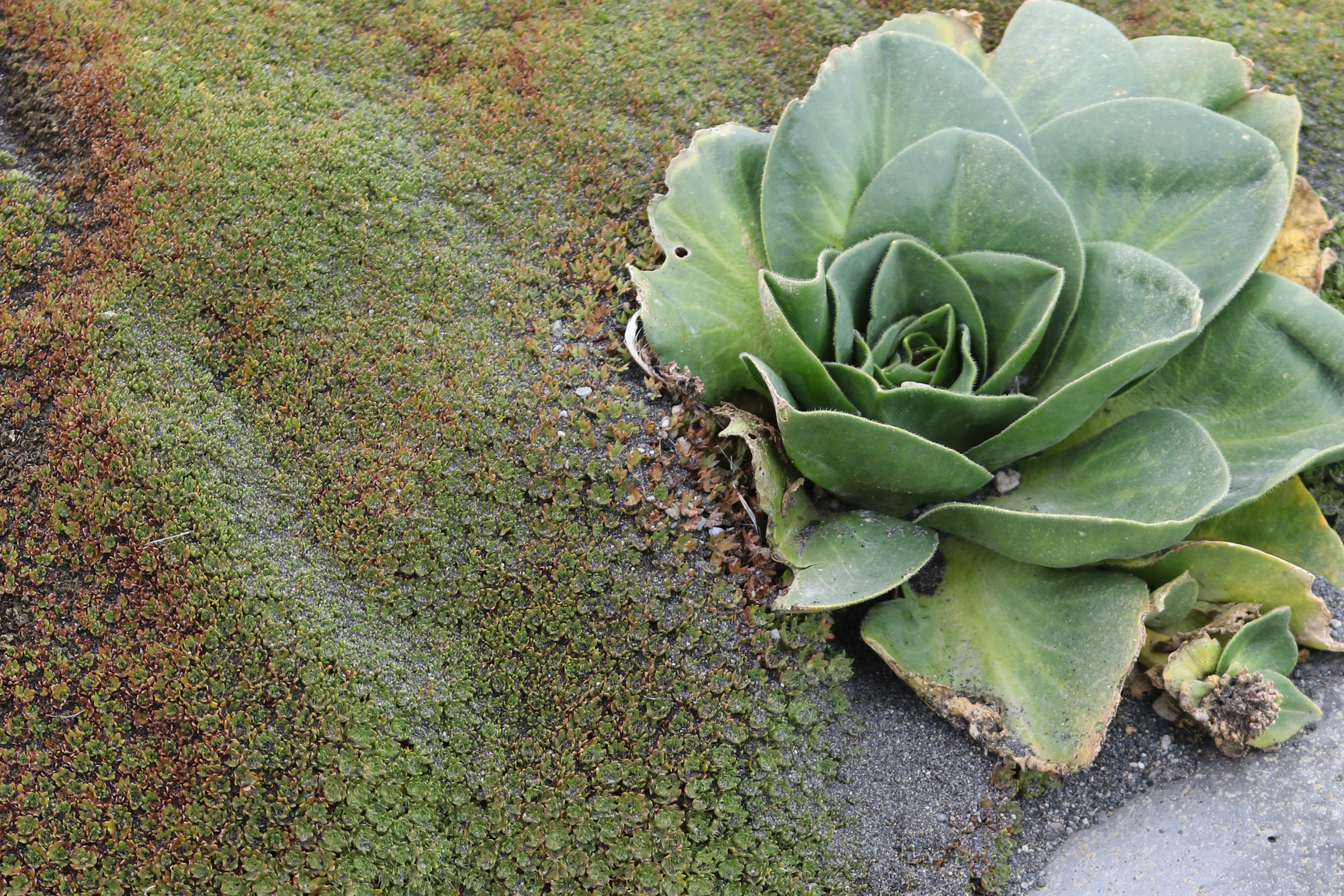
Azorella selago and the Kerguelen cabbage (right) are some of the very few vascular plants found on Heard Island.

Heard Island is mostly glaciated, with small and often disconnected pockets of ice-free land near the coasts. This coast hosts wetlands and lagoons which support unique communities. Vascular plants are rare, even for subantarctic islands, with there being only about 12 native species and no trees. In addition, a single specimen of Leptinella plumosa was found. This species is common on other subantarctic islands and likely arrive naturally. Above 200 metres (660 ft), there are mostly mosses and lichens. The McDonald Islands have similar vegetation. The shallow coastal waters contain at least 17 seaweed species, of which Durvillaea antarctica is the most abundant. 128 terrestrial invertebrate species are known, some of which are endemic.

Large land-based species on the islands thus usually rely exclusively on the ocean for sustenance. In total, 56 seabird species have been recorded, of which 19 nest on Heard Island. The Heard Island shag and a subspecies of the black-faced sheathbill are endemic to the island. The resident king penguin population increased from a recorded 3 individuals in 1947 to 80,000 pairs in 2004. The 16,600 Gentoo penguins represent 6% of the entire species, while the Macaroni penguin population makes up 23% of the global total. The Eastern rockhopper penguin also breeds on the island. The light-mantled albatross population is thought to have been stable at between 200 and 500 pairs from at least the 1950s. The black-browed albatross also breeds on the island, and a pair of wandering albatross were recorded nesting in the 1980s. The seven nesting petrel species are the Wilson's storm petrel, southern giant petrel, pintado petrel, South Georgia diving petrel, common diving petrel, Antarctic prion, and fulmar prion. Many individuals have been found in the territory with tags from other subantarctic and Antarctic areas. There were at least 11 seabird species nesting on McDonald Island before the 2001 eruption; it is unknown how many do so now.

Southern elephant seals breed on Heard Island.

Antarctic fur seals and southern elephant seals also breed on Heard Island, and subantarctic fur seals are thought to breed there irregularly. The crabeater seal, leopard seal, Ross seal, and Weddell seal have also been identified in the territory.

The territory's remoteness and rough environment form barriers to invasive species. The territory is the only location where sheathbills nest without the presence of cats or rats. At least 75 species in the territory are considered nationally threatened. The only non-native plant known is Poa annua grass, which is thought to have arrived through natural processes from Kerguelen where it had been introduced. Three invasive invertebrates are known: the worm Bimastos rubidus, the thrips Apterothrips apteris, and the mite Tyrophagus putrescentiae. Sheep were brought in 1947, but did not establish a wild population.
