= FV Thunder =

Norwegian fishing vessel

FV Thunder was an outlaw fishing vessel sunk in 2015. The ship was built in 1969 in Norway and has gone by many names, including: Vesturvón, Arctic Ranger, Rubin, Typhoon I, Kuko, and Wuhan N4. The Thunder was part of the "Bandit 6", a group of six fishing vessels that illegally fished for Patagonian toothfish in the Southern Ocean. The ship was last registered in Lagos, Nigeria; however, the ship was officially de-listed by Nigeria a week before she sank.

An Interpol notice for the ship was released on 12 April 2013. In May 2014, Thunder was stopped by Malaysian officials for illegal fishing; however, they let the ship go after a fine of $90,000 was paid. From December 17, 2014, to April 6, 2015, two Sea Shepherd vessels, Bob Barker and the Age of Union, as part of "Operation Icefish", pursued the renegade trawler Thunder for 10,000 miles from Antarctic waters where it was illegally fishing for Patagonian toothfish to where Thunder was scuttled in the waters of São Tomé and Príncipe at 00°19′N 005°25′E. The ship was first intercepted on December 17, 2014, at 62°15′S 81°24′E, inside the CCAMLR (Convention for the Conservation of Antarctic Marine Living Resources) region of management while deploying illegal gillnets.

The pursuit of Thunder lasted 110 days, breaking the previous record of 21 days, set by the Australian patrol vessel Southern Supporter in her pursuit of Viarsa 1 in 2003.

At the time of her sinking, the crew consisted of 30 Indonesians and 10 officers from Spain, Chile, and Portugal, who were turned over to the authorities in São Tomé and Príncipe. The officers of the crew were later tried and convicted of several illegal fishing offences. The captain, Luis Alfonso Rubio Cataldo of Chile, was given a three-year sentence. The ship's chief engineer, Agustín Dosil Rey of Spain, was given a two-year and nine-month sentence. The ship's second mechanic, Luis Miguel Pérez Fernández of Spain, was given a two-year and eight-month sentence. Together, they were fined a total of over $17 million. Interpol believes that the vessel was part of a fleet of six operating through shell corporations under Vidal Armadores, a company based in Spain.
