= Ian Urbina =

American journalist

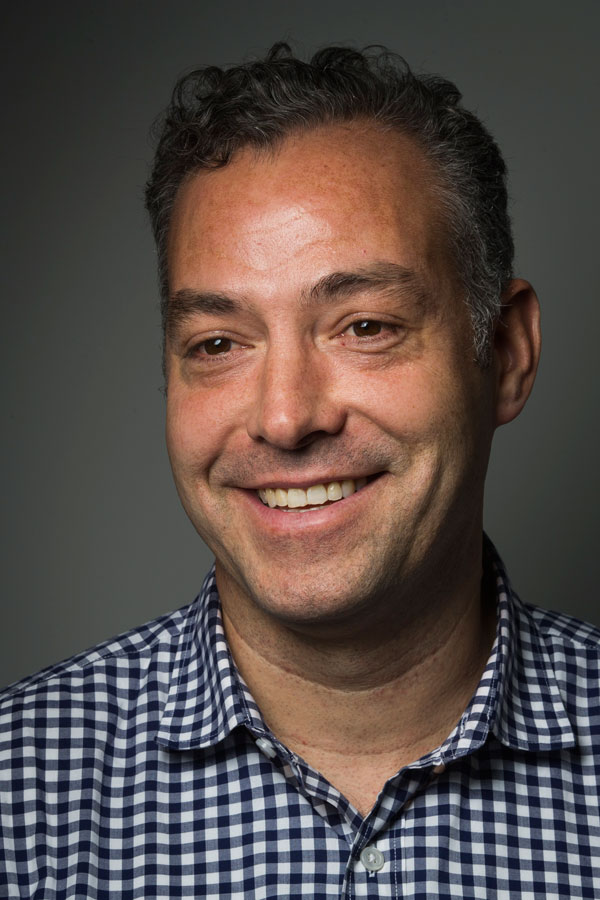
- Born: March 29, 1972 (age 54)
- Education: Georgetown University; University of Chicago
- Occupation: Investigative reporter
- Organization(s): The New York Times, The Atlantic, The Outlaw Ocean Project
- Awards: Pulitzer Prize, Christopher Dickey Award

Ian Urbina (born March 29, 1972) is an American investigative reporter who has written for a variety of outlets, including The New York Times and The Atlantic. Urbina is the author of The New York Times bestseller The Outlaw Ocean and founder of a journalism nonprofit, The Outlaw Ocean Project.

== Early life and education ==
As a student at St Albans and Georgetown University, Urbina was a long-distance runner.

Urbina has degrees in history from Georgetown University and the University of Chicago.

== Career ==
Urbina was outreach editor at the Middle East Research and Information Project from 2000 to 2003.

A 2007 New York Times investigation by Urbina about "mag crews" — traveling groups of teenagers, many of them runaways or from broken homes, who sell magazine subscriptions — was optioned for a 2016 movie, American Honey, directed by Andrea Arnold and starring Shia LaBeouf.

In 2008, Urbina was a member of the team of reporters that broke the story about the New York governor, Eliot Spitzer, and his use of prostitutes, a series of stories for which the Times staff won a Pulitzer Prize in 2009 for breaking news.

In 2011, Urbina wrote a series "Drilling Down" about the oil and gas industry and fracking. John Krasinski said that the 2012 film Promised Land was partly inspired by the series.

In 2013, he wrote a story about longterm exposure to hazardous chemicals and the federal agency, OSHA, which is responsible for protecting against these workplace threats. For The New York Times Magazine, he wrote in 2014, a piece called "The Secret Life of Passwords" about the anecdotes and emotions hidden in everyday web-users' "secure" passwords.

He left The New York Times in May 2019 to found the non-profit journalism organization, The Outlaw Ocean Project.

In 2022, 'Get Away from the Target', a documentary film for which Urbina was Executive Producer, won an Emmy Award.

== The Outlaw Ocean ==
In 2015, Urbina wrote a series called "The Outlaw Ocean" about lawlessness on the high seas. To report the stories, Urbina traveled through Africa, Asia, Europe, and the Middle East, much of that time spent on fishing ships, chronicling a diversity of crimes offshore, including the killing of stowaways, sea slavery, intentional dumping, illegal fishing, the stealing of ships, gun-running, stranding of crews, and murder with impunity. This series served as the basis of the 2019 book, The Outlaw Ocean, which has since been published in various countries and languages. In 2015, Leonardo DiCaprio, Netflix, and Kevin Misher bought the scripted and non-scripted rights for The Outlaw Ocean. The series won various journalism awards, including the George Polk Awards for Foreign Reporting, and the Sigma Delta Chi Award for Foreign Correspondence from the Society of Professional Journalists.

In 2019, Urbina created Synesthesia Media and recruited hundreds of musicians from more than 80 countries for his Outlaw Ocean Music Project.

In 2021, Urbina was accused by musicians of exploiting recording artists through the Outlaw Ocean Music Project. Musician Benn Jordan claimed Urbina kept most of the revenue from the Outlaw Ocean Music Project for himself and his company, Synesthesia Media. Urbina was listed on streaming services as co-author of more than 2,000 songs by more than 400 artists in the project. Musicians shared emails showing that Urbina had solicited them through his New York Times email address for the project, when he was no longer at The Times, and that Urbina had not disclosed that Synesthesia was in fact owned by him. Urbina responded that he did not profit from the project. The New York Times said it was "looking into the matter."

In 2022, Urbana released a self-hosted, 7-part podcast series by The Outlaw Ocean Project, in collaboration with the CBC and LA Times. A second season of the podcast was released in the summer of 2025.

== Bibliography ==
- 2019: The Outlaw Ocean: Journeys Across the Last Untamed Frontier. Knopf Doubleday, New York 2019, ISBN 978-0451492944.
- 2005: Life's Little Annoyances: True Tales of People Who Just Can't Take It Anymore. Reprint, Henry Holt and Company, New York 2010, ISBN 978-0805083033.
