= McDonald Islands =

Sub-Antarctic volcanic peak territories near Heard Island

Highest point
- Elevation: 230 m (750 ft)

Geography
- Location: Heard Island and McDonald Islands, Australia

Geology
- Mountain type: Complex volcano
- Last eruption: July 2005

Location in the Indian Ocean

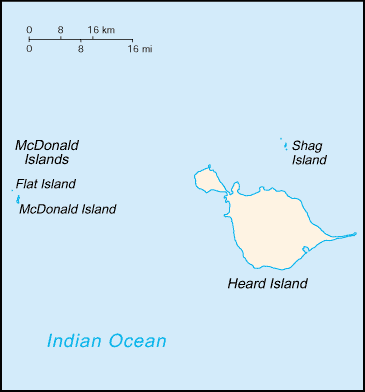
Map of Heard Island and McDonald Islands

McDonald Island

The McDonald Islands (53°3′34.9″S 72°35′32.2″E) are an uninhabited archipelago in the southern Indian Ocean in the vicinity of Heard Island (53°06′S 73°31′E). Together with Heard Island, they make up the Australian external territory of Heard Island and McDonald Islands. The McDonald Islands are the emergent peaks of submarine volcanoes and are Australian external territory. Prior to 1992, there had not been an eruption in the previous 75,000 years.

== Morphology ==
The McDonald Islands comprise three islands: McDonald Island, Flat Island (which later merged with McDonald Island), Needle Island, and Meyer Rock. The islands are mostly composed of phonolitic low-silica pumice, dikes and lava domes, and sit atop the submarine Kerguelen Plateau. They are located about 75 km from Heard Island.

McDonald Island is the largest of the islands, at around 1 square kilometre (250 acres) in area. It has been the main focus of volcanic activity in recent times. Prior to 1996, McDonald Island had been a flat green island whose pumice beaches provided a great nesting area for penguin breeding. The island now has two main peaks, Maxwell Hill and Samarang Hill – the highest is Maxwell Hill at 230 metres (750 ft).

Flat Island was originally a low-lying island adjacent to McDonald Island. It has since merged with McDonald Island as a result of volcanic activity since the 1980s.

Needle Island is a small, pinnacle rock or outcrop located about 0.2 nautical miles (0.4 km) off the shore of McDonald Island.

Meyer Island is a pinnacle rock that sits about 1 nautical mile (2 km) northwest of McDonald Island, making it the most distant of these features relative to the main island.

== Eruptions ==
Prior to 1992, no eruptions had taken place at the McDonald Islands volcano for 75,000 years. A series of eruptions began in 1992.

=== 1992 eruption ===
The first recorded eruption from the McDonalds was from a submarine vent (a small VEI-0 eruption) in December 1992. The eruption was probably the cause of pumice that washed up on the shore of Heard Island.

=== 1996–1997 eruption ===
Fresh eruptions were reported in December 1996 when a vapour plume was noticed by an aeroplane pilot.

The plume was thought to have originated from Heard Island's Big Ben cone. However, on 18 March 1997 the crew of a passing ship heading for Heard Island reported that steam rose vigorously from a fissure on McDonald Island's steep north face; steam also vented from the island's north summit. Steam vented from a rubble-covered slope, indicating that a lava flow or pyroclastic flow had occurred.

On 2 April 1997, the crew of another ship noted that steam continued to vent from the fissure, rising from the summit and flanks of the island. That crew also observed lava flows travelling down gullies; the lava flows covered a significant area of the north part of the island. Sulphur deposits were also discovered and fresh pumice washed up on Heard Island. The eruption is estimated to have ended sometime in January–March 1997.

=== 2001 eruption ===
Another eruption started at McDonald Island in 2001. The eruption was first sighted from a ship passing by the islands. Material was being ejected from the flanks of the island and also in the north and northwest of the island, and steam was issuing from near the summit crater. Work suggested that prior to the ship's visit, the volcano had been erupting, covering the island in dark, smooth material. Many features had been filled in, such as Williams Bay. The eruptions had also joined Flat Island to McDonald Island as 400 metres (1,300 ft) of land had been added to windward point. A new volcanic cone had also been created. An observation made in November 2002 noted two new lava domes had been formed; their date of formation is unknown.

=== 2005 eruption ===
Analysis of satellite imagery noted that an eruption took place on 12 July 2005 on the northwest shore of the island. The eruption may have added a small portion to the area of the island.

In total, the eruptions are thought to have doubled the island's size.

== 2025 US tariffs ==
In early April 2025, US President Donald Trump announced widespread tariffs against countries and territories around the world, including Heard Island and the McDonald Islands. The tariff placed on the McDonald Islands is 10%, which is in line with the rest of Australia. In reaction to the tariff, Australian Prime Minister Anthony Albanese remarked "It just shows and exemplifies the fact that nowhere on Earth is safe from this."

== Heritage ==
In 2002 the Heard Island and McDonald Islands were declared a marine reserve; this was expanded in 2014, and further expansion was being considered in 2024. The islands are also recognised as a World Heritage Site.
