= Meyer Rock =

Islet near the subantarctic McDonald Island

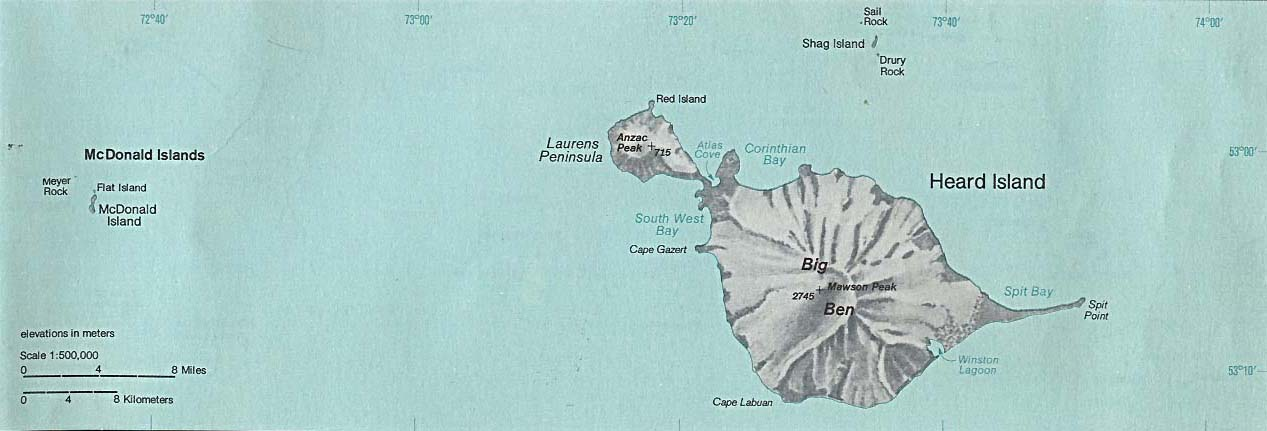
Meyer Rock is to the northwest of McDonald Island

Meyer Rock (53°1′S 72°34′E) is a pinnacle rock 1 nautical mile (2 km) northwest of McDonald Island in the McDonald Islands. This feature was charted as "Meyers Rock" on an 1874 chart by the British Challenger expedition, but the form Meyer Rock is now approved. Captain Johann Meyer of the German ship La Rochelle sighted the island group in 1857, not realizing the prior discovery by Captain William McDonald in 1854.
