= Sea Shepherd Conservation Society =

American marine conservation organization

- Flag
- Founded: 1977
- Founder: Paul Watson
- Type: Public charity (US); registered charity (UK)
- Purpose: Marine conservation activism
- Location(s): Friday Harbor, Washington, US; Melbourne, Victoria, Australia
- Region served: Global
- Method: Direct action
- Website: seashepherd.org

The Sea Shepherd Conservation Society (SSCS) is a non-profit, marine conservation activism organization based in Friday Harbor on San Juan Island, Washington, in the United States. Sea Shepherd employs direct action tactics to achieve its goals, most famously by deploying its fleet of ships to track, report on and actively impede the work of fishing vessels they believe to be engaged in illegal and unregulated activities causing the unsustainable exploitation of marine life.

Sea Shepherd has been criticized by some environmental groups and national governments that oppose its tactics. The Japanese government, whose whaling industry is a leading target of the organization's efforts, has called Sea Shepherd eco-terrorists for "impeding their research".

== History ==
The predecessor organization of Sea Shepherd, the "Earth Force Society", was formed in 1977, after its founder, Paul Watson, was ousted from the board of Greenpeace for disagreements over his direct action activism which clashed with their pacifist nature. Watson soon left Greenpeace. Initially without funding and with only a small group of supporters, Watson convinced Cleveland Amory, head of the Fund for Animals, to fund Watson's first vessel, the Sea Shepherd in 1978.

The first direct action undertaken by the organization was against Canadian seal hunting in the Gulf of St. Lawrence in March 1979. The same year, the Sea Shepherd also rammed an unregulated Portuguese whaling vessel, the notorious Sierra. After the Portugal campaign, the first Sea Shepherd had to be scuttled, but Watson sold the story to raise money to fund his next vessel. He then spent the 1980s undertaking a variety of controversial and dangerous operations in support of various marine conservation aims, and physically intervened against Russian, Spanish, Norwegian, Icelandic, Makah, Faroese, and Japanese whalers.

In the 1990s the group is described as having undertaken a shift in its public attitude. Having previously argued primarily from an ethical viewpoint, Sea Shepherd began to describe itself as an anti-poaching agency, a claim it based on its interpretation of the maritime and conservation law. The decade also saw the organization make more progress in saving wildlife, including by teaming up with other groups to reduce the prevalence of driftnet fishing. In 1994, Sea Shepherd sank an illegal Norwegian whaling vessel. However, no charges were brought as the vessel had been involved in even more illegal behavior than anticipated by the authorities.

The organization began in the 2000s by assisting with the clean up of the Petrobras oil spill, Brazil's worst oil spill to date, after being contracted by the Rio government to mitigate against the devastation. Sea Shepherd also cooperated with other governments against maritime poaching, including in Costa Rica, though not always with good outcomes. In 2008, Sea Shepherd conducted two trips around Antarctica to disrupt illegal whaling practices.

Since 2014, Sea Shepherd has increasingly co-operated with national governments in assisting anti-poaching activity in national territorial waters and marine reserves, including with the Italian Coast Guard in Sicily (Operation Siracusa), Mexican Navy (Operation Milagro) and the Coastguards of Gabon and São Tomé and Príncipe (Operation Albacore), which saw Gabonese military marines sail aboard Sea Shepherd vessels.

In late 2022, a schism occurred after Paul Watson was removed from the board of directors of Sea Shepherd Global, a move which, he says, was due to the organization shifting away from his policy of independent, direct action to one of collaboration with governments. Watson subsequently formed his own organization, the Captain Paul Watson Foundation, and a competing Sea Shepherd group called Sea Shepherd Origins. The France, UK, and Brazil chapters of Sea Shepherd have pledged their allegiance to Paul Watson and Sea Shepherd Origins, and have left the umbrella of Sea Shepherd Global. Neither Sea Shepherd Global or the regional chapters that remain loyal to it have issued statements in regard to these events.

== Organization ==
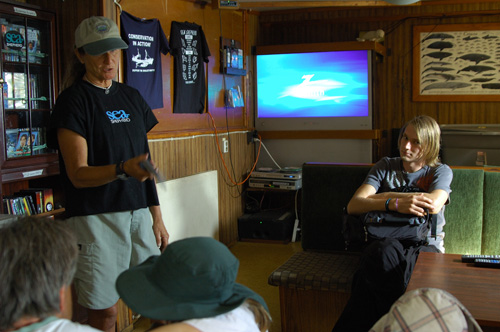
A wildlife advocate during an education session on board RV Farley Mowat

Sea Shepherd is a non-governmental, non-profit environmental organization. In the United States it has a 501(c)(3) tax exempt status. Most of the organization's revenue is spent on its programs – 89.9 percent in 2019, with just 10.1 percent spent on administrative costs and fundraising. Sea Shepherd has also been rated highly for financial transparency and accountability. The group is supported by private and corporate donations, lectures by Watson, internet advertising and grants. It is operated by volunteers and a small paid staff, and is committed to staying small and with low spending on fundraising or recruitment.

Sea Shepherd is governed by a board of directors and several boards of advisers, each addressing an area of expertise. The Scientific, Technical and Conservation Advisory Board includes Earth First! founder Dave Foreman and Horst Klienschmidt, a former deputy chair of the International Whaling Commission (2006). The Legal and Law Enforcement Advisory Board includes Ian Campbell, a former Australian Minister of the Environment and Heritage (2004–07). The Animal Welfare, Humane and Animal Rights Advisory Board included animal rights philosopher Tom Regan, until his death in 2017. There is also a Media and Arts Advisory Board, Photography Advisory Board and a Financial and Management Advisory Board.

== Direct action activism ==
Sea Shepherd engages in conventional protests and direct actions to protect marine wildlife. Sea Shepherd operations have included interdiction against commercial fishing, shark poaching and finning, seal hunting, and whaling. The group has been active in intervening against fishing and poaching in the South Pacific, the Mediterranean, and in waters around the Galapagos Islands. In addition to their direct action campaigns, Sea Shepherd works on ocean issues such as plastic pollution. Sea Shepherd chapters across the world organize onshore cleanups throughout the year to pick up debris near oceans, streams, and rivers. In April 2018, Sea Shepherd released a PSA that takes an artistic approach to telling target audiences that more than one million marine animals die every year from plastic debris.

According to its mission statement, Sea Shepherd "uses innovative direct-action tactics to investigate, document, and take action when necessary to expose and confront illegal activities on the high seas". In addition to the organization's role of documenting and reporting violations of conservation laws, Sea Shepherd operations have utilized direct, non-lethal tactics including scuttling and disabling whaling vessels at harbor, intervening in Canadian and Namibian seal hunts, shining laser light at whalers, throwing bottles of foul-smelling butyric acid onto vessels at sea, boarding whaling vessels to protest while at sea, and seizing and destroying drift nets at sea. Sea Shepherd argues that these tactics are necessary to uncover and impede actions that violate international laws protecting wildlife, as the international community has shown itself unwilling or unable to stop species-endangering whaling and fishing practices.

Sea Shepherd staff and equipment have also been on the receiving end of physical violence by members of the fishing industry. In November 1998, Makah seized an inflatable boat belonging to the group and threw rocks at the Sea Shepherd's Sirenian in response to protests over their whale hunt. In 2005, 11 Sea Shepherd crew were involved in an altercation with sealers while on the ice. The sealers were not charged with any crime, but the activists were arrested and later convicted for approaching too close to the hunt. In 2008, fishermen in the French islands of Saint Pierre and Miquelon cut the mooring lines of the Farley Mowat after hearing Watson make disparaging comments about the deaths of four seal hunters.

In 2009, Paul Watson claimed the organization has sunk ten whaling ships while also destroying millions of dollars' worth of equipment. Their practice of attacking and sinking other ships has led to reports of injuries to other sailors as well as the Sea Shepherd crew, including concussions and complications from chemical attacks. Watson considers the actions of Sea Shepherd to be against criminal operations and has called the group an anti-poaching organization. Critics claim that Sea Shepherd's actions constitute violations of international law, while Watson has stated that Sea Shepherd believes that their actions constitute an attempt to enforce international conservation laws and international maritime law under the World Charter for Nature adopted by the United Nations. Australia has declared Japan's hunt in the Southern Ocean Whale Sanctuary to be illegal, and federal court judge Jim Allsop has stated "there is no practical mechanism by which orders of this court can be enforced". The lack of official enforcement mechanisms in the law prompted Sea Shepherd to adopt, without official sanction, what it sees as a law enforcement mission. A 2008 academic paper by researchers at Monash University in Melbourne, Victoria, concluded that Sea Shepherd's approach could constitute vigilantism, because its seeks to enforce a legal status quo in the face of the international community's "inabilities or unwillingness to do so".

=== Anti-whaling controversy ===
Watson left Greenpeace in 1977 after being voted off the board over his confrontational methods. Since then, Greenpeace has criticized Sea Shepherd for the group's tactics, particularly regarding its interaction with whaling ships while at sea. The rival environmental group maintains Sea Shepherd is a violent organization whose tactics may endanger the lives of fishermen and whalers, and has labelled Watson an extremist. Greenpeace has also stated: "By making it easy to paint anti-whaling forces as dangerous, piratical terrorists, Sea Shepherd could undermine the forces within Japan which could actually bring whaling to an end". In his 2009 book, Whaling in Japan, Jun Morikawa stated that Sea Shepherd's confrontational tactics had strengthened Japan's resolve to continue with its whaling program by helping to rally domestic support from Japanese citizens who might otherwise have been ambivalent about the practice of hunting and eating whales.

In March 2014 the International Court of Justice ruled Japan's whaling program was not for scientific purposes. The Court ordered that Japan "revoke any extant authorization, permit or licence to kill, take or treat whales" and refrain from granting any further permits." In response to the court ruling, Japan cut its annual whaling quota from 915 to 333. The new quota included only minke whales, and ended the hunting of humpback whales and fin whales. Paul Watson said: "I think we've done an amazing job reducing their quotas and saving whales," and claimed the actions of Sea Shepherd were a major factor behind Japan's decision. In 2017, Sea Shepherd said it would stop sending ships to the Antarctic Ocean in pursuit of Japanese whalers, citing Japan's increased use of military surveillance satellites and passage of anti-terrorism laws specifically to thwart Sea Shepherd. Japan passed new anti-terrorism legislation in view of the coming 2020 Olympics, but among its elements, the new law declared the presence of eco-activist vessels near whalers a terrorist offence. The combined measures were deemed to make Sea Shepherd's Antarctic operations no longer productive, with Watson noting his organisation "cannot compete with their military-grade technology".

== Public relations ==
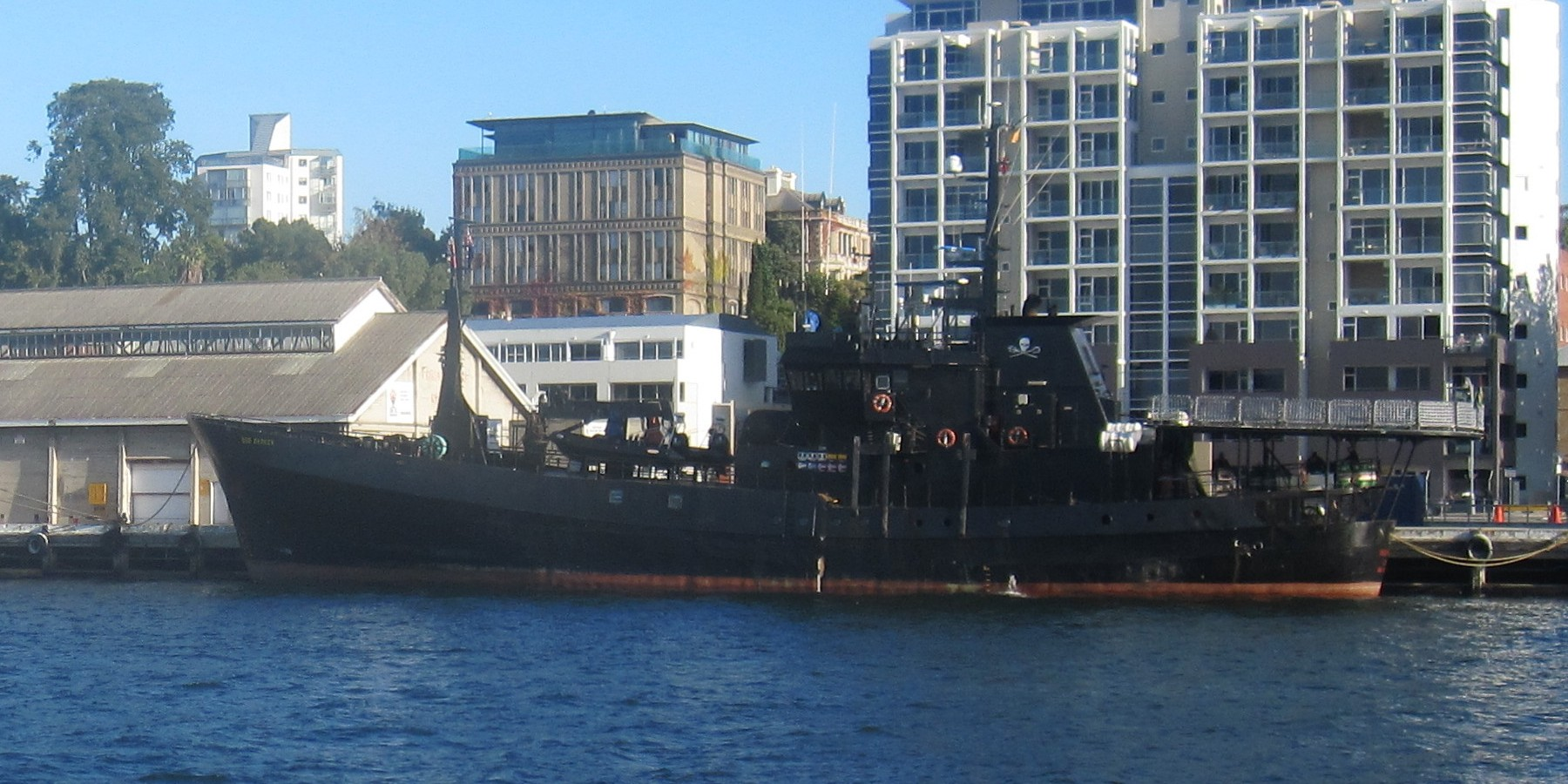
A $5 million donation from Bob Barker facilitated the purchase of the MY Bob Barker, pictured here docked in Hobart, Tasmania.

The Sea Shepherd Conservation Society has been called "media savvy" for their use of the press. The group has worked with journalists and has made statements through press releases to spread its message during various campaigns.

Watson's public relations efforts are shown in an episode of Whale Wars when he creates an international "media storm" after two Sea Shepherd crewmembers are detained on a Japanese whaling vessel. In his book, Earthforce!, Watson advises readers to make up facts and figures when they need to and to deliver them to reporters confidently. He also states that the "truth is irrelevant" due to the nature of mass media. In response to criticism that he manipulates the media, Watson has stated: "What we do is provide the media with the kind of stories they can't resist... and this is how we bring attention to what's happening to the whales, the seals, the sharks and the other marine conservation campaigns we're involved in."

Sea Shepherd has also used satellite uplinks, webcams, and internet blogging during its operations in the Southern Ocean, and has invited the media to ride along. In 2006, representatives from Seven network and National Geographic magazine, along with documentary filmmakers, accompanied the group. In a television series entitled Whale Wars, Discovery Communications, Inc. documented Sea Shepherd's 2008/09 Antarctic campaign against Japanese whalers, following events on the Steve Irwin. The program premiered on November 7, 2008, on Discovery's Animal Planet network.

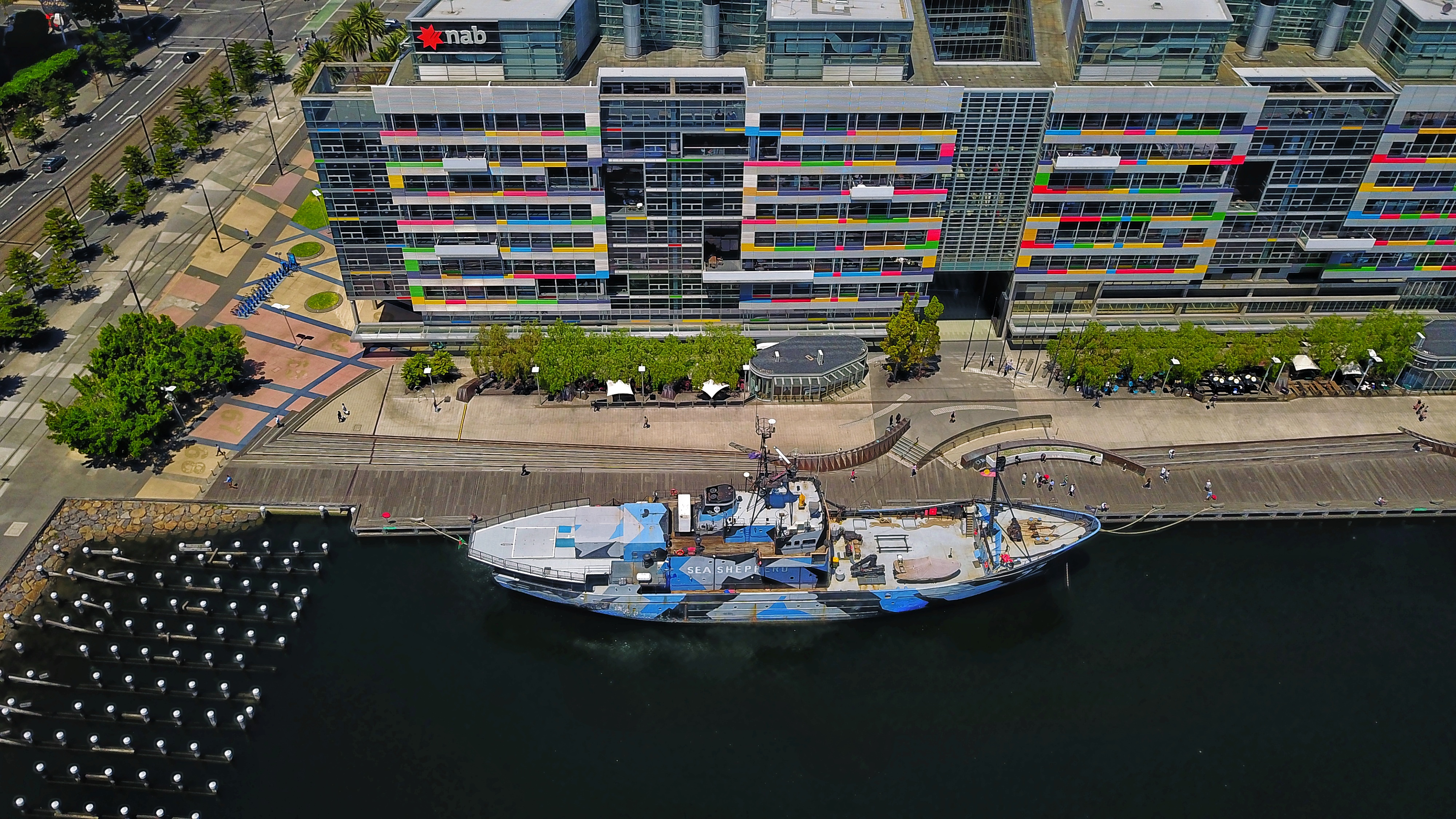
Aerial perspective of the Sea Shepherd docked at the Victoria Harbour Promenade, Waterfront end of Enterprize Way, Docklands, February 2019

Sea Shepherd has received financial contributions from celebrities and businessmen such as entrepreneur Steve Wynn, television personality Bob Barker, and John Paul DeJoria, as well as other celebrities. Martin Sheen, Daryl Hannah, and Richard Dean Anderson have joined the group during protests. Actors including Edward Norton, Pierce Brosnan, Christian Bale, Clive Standen and Emily Deschanel have supported the group through contributions, while William Shatner has also been mentioned as supporting the group. Actress and model Pamela Anderson is an active spokesperson for the group, has participated in several campaigns, served on the board of directors and is a close friend of founder Paul Watson. In 2007, actor Heath Ledger conceived and directed a music video of the Modest Mouse song "King Rat", intended to raise awareness of the whale hunts taking place each year off the coast of his native Australia. Although Ledger died before the video could be completed, others finished it in his honor and debuted the video online in August 2009. Proceeds from iTunes sales of the video in its first month of release were donated to Sea Shepherd.

From the music industry, Anthony Kiedis of the Red Hot Chili Peppers, Leona Lewis, Rick Rubin, and the groups Hawkwind, The Red Paintings, Propagandhi, Gojira, Parkway Drive, Heaven Shall Burn, Stick to Your Guns, The Amity Affliction and Architects have financially supported Sea Shepherd. Architects vocalist Sam Carter is also one of Sea Shepherd's British ambassadors. Vegan straight edge band Earth Crisis and Zoltán Téglás of Ignite support SSCS, among other environmental organizations, dedicating songs such as "So Others Live" and "Ultramilitance" to them. Giacomo "Josh" Giorgi, vocalist of now-defunct Italian straight edge hardcore band To Kill is the bosun's mate aboard the MY Steve Irwin. In 2009, professional surfer Kelly Slater joined a Quiksilver Australia/Sea Shepherd partnership featuring a fundraising clothing line, including board shorts designed by Slater. In 2013 alt-metal band Klogr started supporting Sea Shepherd in Europe through the videos "Guinea Pigs" (2013) and "Zero Tolerance" (2014), featuring images from Sea Shepherd documentaries filmed in Taiji and other missions.

The Lush cosmetics company joined with Sea Shepherd to raise awareness about the practice of shark finning in 2008. Lush produced 'Shark Fin Soap' (punning on 'shark fin soup'); all sale proceeds were directed to Sea Shepherd.

In Tasmania, Sea Shepherd has been banned from participation in the Australian Wooden Boat Festival on the grounds that its presence could jeopardize the reputation of the organization which aims to celebrate maritime heritage, but not modern maritime issues in Australian waters.

For years, Mexico depended on Sea Shepherd to remove the illegal nets that trap and drown vaquita porpoises in the Gulf of California. In January 2021, Sea Shepherds had to leave the Gulf after a New Year's Eve attack where a fisherman rammed a Sea Shepherd vessel. One fisherman died of injuries sustained during the attack. Mexico has invited Sea Shepherd back to help save the vaquita, but will no longer allow them to remove nets.

== Fleet of ships ==
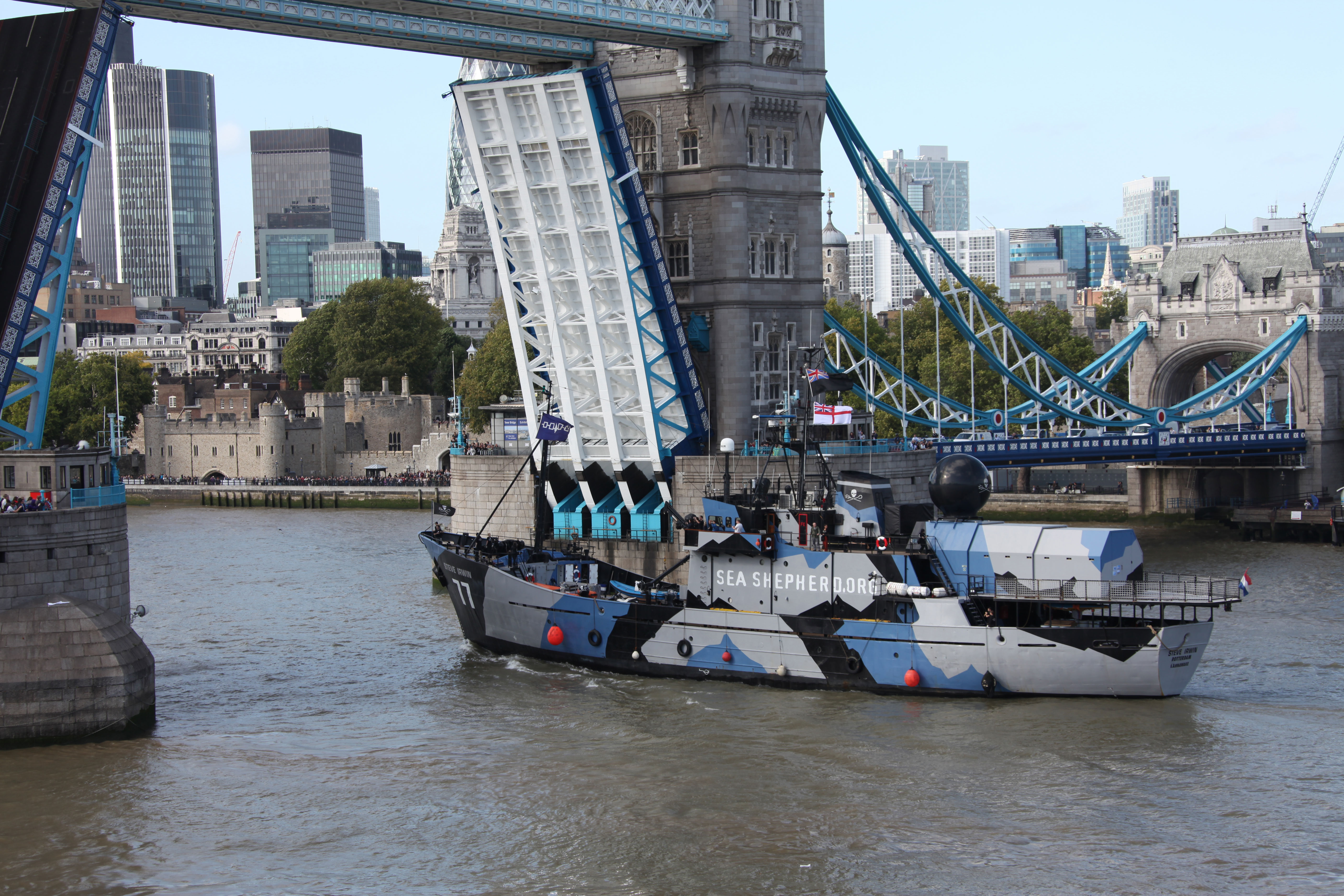
The MY Steve Irwin in September 2011, sailing up river under Tower Bridge in London

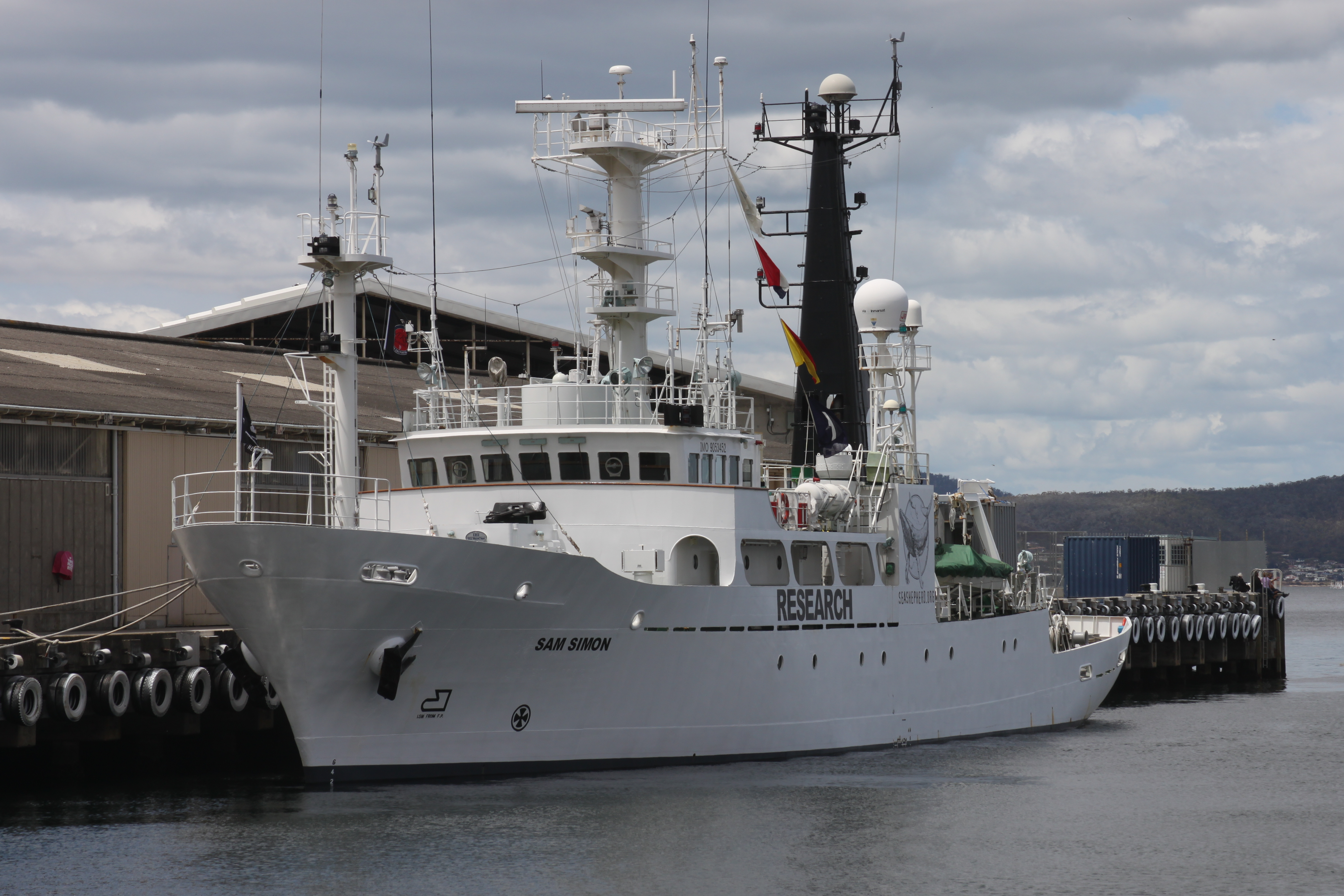
The MY Sam Simon in Hobart, Tasmania, December 2012

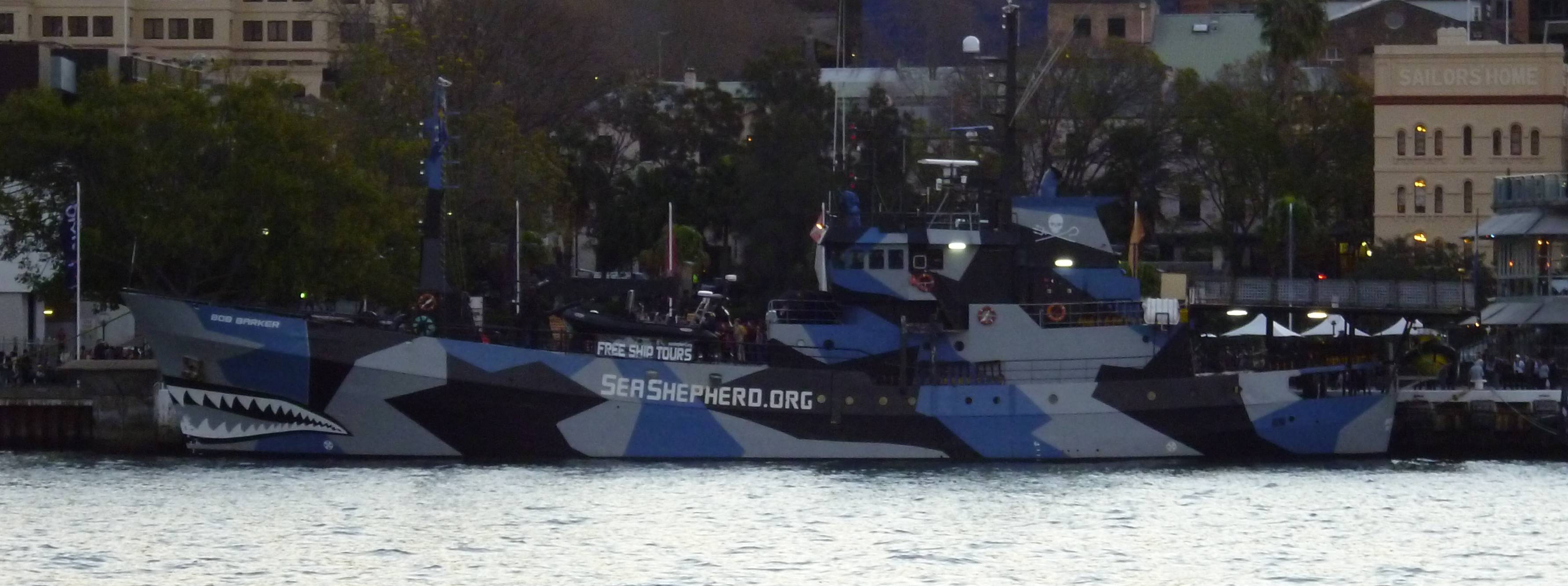
MY Bob Barker berthed at Circular Quay in Sydney, Australia, in 2012

Sea Shepherd refer to the ships it has operated as Neptune's Navy. As of 2021, the conservation society operates 12 ships: Ocean Warrior, Brigitte Bardot, Bob Barker, Steve Irwin, Sam Simon, John Paul DeJoria, Farley Mowat, Sharpie, Jairo Mora Sandoval, White Holly, Martin Sheen and Sea Eagle.

The Steve Irwin was obtained in 2007 and originally called the Robert Hunter, named in honor of Robert Hunter, co-founder of Greenpeace. Irwin's widow, Terri, gave her support to Sea Shepherd, saying: "Whales have always been in Steve's heart and in 2006 he was investigating the possibility of joining the Sea Shepherd on part of its journey to defend these beautiful animals." The other ship, the 1200 ton Bob Barker, was named after well-known television game show host and animal activist Bob Barker, who made the purchase in Ghana of the retired Norwegian whaling vessel possible with a donation of US$5 million. In February 2010, the Bob Barker collided with the Japanese whaling vessel Yushin Maru No. 3, tearing a gash in the hull of the Bob Barker. In December 2014, the Bob Barker began its pursuit of the illegal fishing vessel, the FV Thunder, part of the Bandit 6 and involved in illegally fishing the Patagonian toothfish, which became the longest chase in nautical history covering over 10,000 nautical miles and lasting 110 days.

The group also formerly operated the Farley Mowat (impounded by the Canadian government, with Sea Shepherd having stated that they have no intention of paying the legal fines and berthage fees to recover their now obsolete vessel) and the Ady Gil, formerly known as the Earthrace (sunk after a collision with the MV Shōnan Maru 2 whaling security vessel in early 2010) as well as a number of earlier vessels.

Sea Shepherd acquired the Ocean 7 Adventurer for its 2010/11 campaign against Japanese whaling in the Antarctic. In November 2010, Mayor Brad Pettitt of Fremantle, Western Australia, christened the vessel Gojira with Fremantle as its home port, making this the first Sea Shepherd ship registered in Australia, with an Australian crew. The Gojira was renamed MV Brigitte Bardot in May 2011 after complaints of copyright infringement by Toho.

For the 2011–2012 Antarctic campaign, the organization acquired drone aircraft to assist in their surveillance of the whaling ships.

In July 2012, Sam Simon, a co-creator of The Simpsons, reportedly donated money to purchase the fourth vessel, a former German icebreaker. The actual ship however turned out to be a former Japanese weather survey vessel, now called the MY Sam Simon.

On October 18, 2014, the actor Martin Sheen unveiled Sea Shepherd's newest vessel, R/V Martin Sheen, named in his honor, and captained by Oona Layolle of France. The name of this vessel carries the prefix "R/V" because it will be engaged in direct action as a research vessel.

In January 2015, two decommissioned, 30-knot, Island-class Coast Guard cutters were spotted flying the Sea Shepherd flag in Annapolis Yacht Basin. In June 2015, Sea Shepherd revealed on their website that they had purchased these vessels. One is named MY Farley Mowat, after an earlier vessel impounded by the Canadian government, and the other was named MY Jules Verne, after the author of the 1870 novel Twenty Thousand Leagues Under the Seas, but was renamed MV John Paul DeJoria on January 31, 2017.

On December 7, 2017, the organization announced the acquisition of a third Island-class Cutter thanks to a donation from Chris Sharp, a biotech businessman. The vessel was named MV Sharpie, and for its maiden mission it will join Operation Milagro in the Gulf of California to help save the endangered vaquita porpoise.

The ships of the fleet have flown the flags of a variety of different nations. Canada, Belize, UK and Togo have revoked the registrations of various vessels. Both the Steve Irwin and Bob Barker ships now sail under Dutch flag leading to direct complaints by the Japanese government towards Dutch ambassadors. The Netherlands consequently considered revoking the registrations for both vessels but finally decided not to do so.

== Government response ==
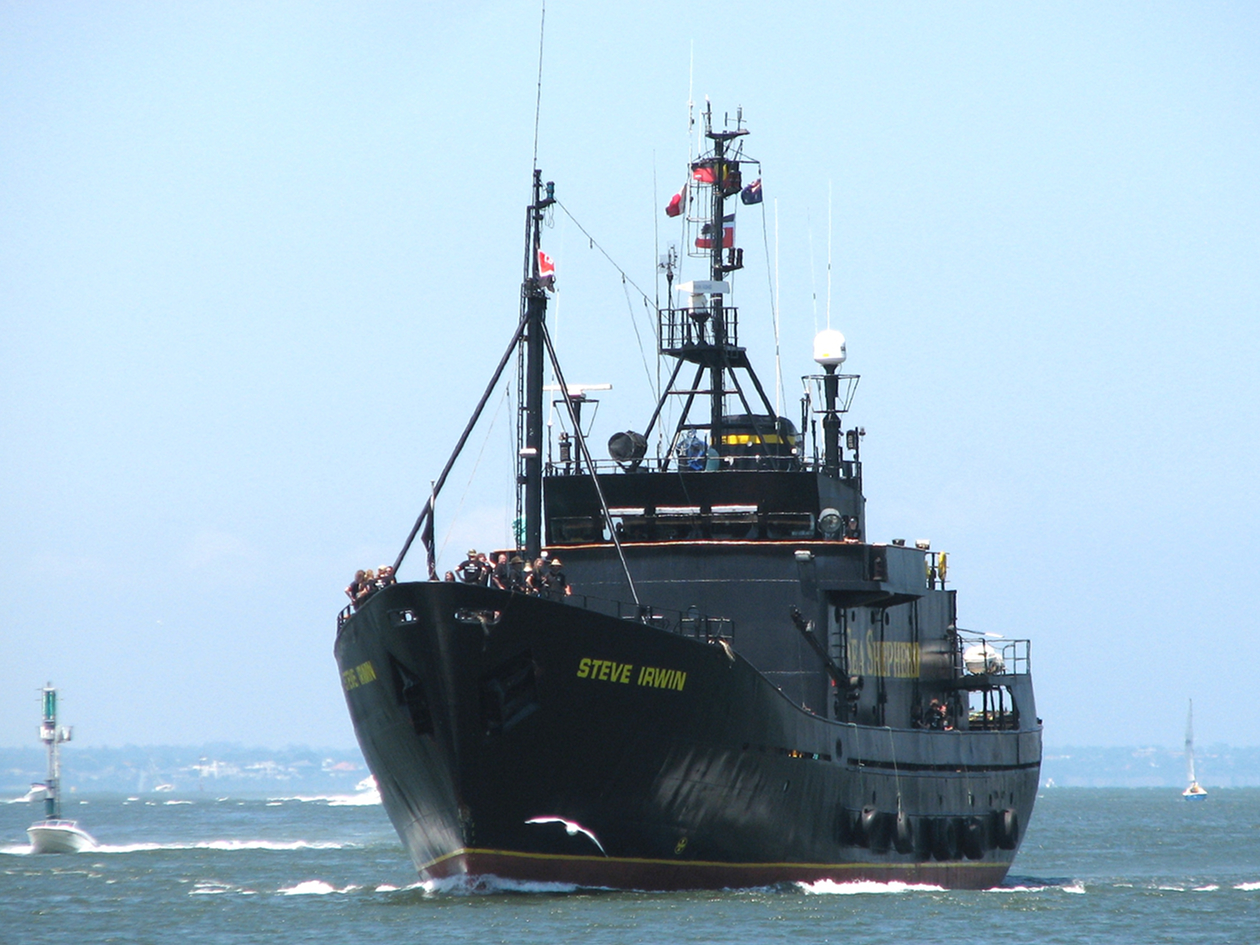
MY Steve Irwin approaching Melbourne, Victoria

In testimony on "The Threat of Eco-Terrorism" given to a US congressional subcommittee in 2002, Sea Shepherd was the first group mentioned by an FBI official for having attacked commercial fishing operations by cutting drift nets. An earlier Canadian intelligence report on "single issue terrorism" stated that "Watson and his supporters have been involved in a number of militant actions against whale hunting, driftnet fishing, seal hunting and other related issues" and mentions "activities against logging operations in Canada". In 2007, Ian Campbell, then the Australian Environment Minister and a vigorous critic of Japan's whaling, once opposed Sea Shepherd's tactics, saying that it really put the cause of conservation backwards. Due to the 2008 operations against Canadian seal hunters, Danny Williams, Premier of Newfoundland and Labrador, called Watson a terrorist and said that Sea Shepherd was not welcome in the province. The group has been accused of eco-terrorism by the Japanese government, whose internationally banned whaling program is a principal focus of the Sea Shepherd. It has also been opposed by some countries that also oppose whaling, including Australia and New Zealand.

Sea Shepherd has based many of its operations out of Australia with foreign crew members being able to travel in and out of the country on tourist visas, but in October 2009, the Australian Immigration Department imposed additional criminal background checks on Watson and his first officer, Peter Hammarstedt, when they applied for visas. Watson criticized the action as a submission to Japanese pressure by the Rudd government. The Australian government rejected the idea it had delayed the visas, and on October 20, 2009, they were issued. By contrast, the Tasmanian Greens and the former Greens Senator Bob Brown, has endorsed and supported Sea Shepherd in various ways, including through advocacy within the Australian government and public endorsement of the group. However, when the Steve Irwin returned to Hobart, Tasmania, in February 2009, Australian Federal Police seized film footage and the ship's logs, reportedly prompted by complaints from Japan. Brown demanded that the Australian Prime Minister, Kevin Rudd, order their immediate return, but a spokesman for the Home Affairs Minister said it was a federal police matter. In 2013, Julie Bishop, the Foreign Minister of Australia, told the press club of Japan, "We do not, and will never, condone reckless, dangerous, unlawful behaviour. And where it occurs on the high seas, we will unreservedly condemn it. The fact that the Sea Shepherd visits Australian ports or some of the Sea Shepherd fleet might be registered in Australia is not indicative in any way of the Australian government's support for the organisation." When Sea Shepherd indicated it was abandoning pursuit of Japanese whalers in 2017, Watson noted the hostility of the governments in the US, Australia and New Zealand, which he accused of acting "in league with Japan" against the organisation.

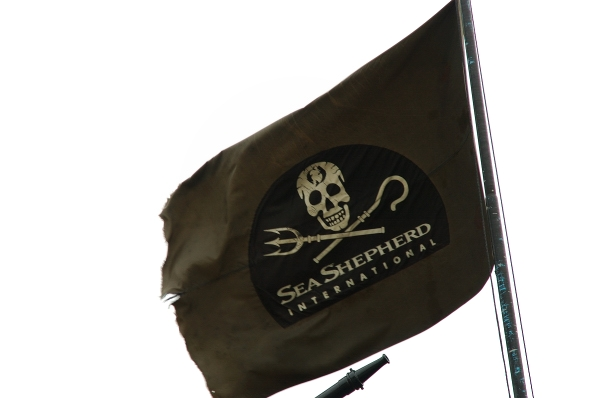
A variation of the flag used by the group

Officials in Japan have attempted to combat Sea Shepherd at the highest levels, discussing the revocation of the group's tax exempt status with their counterparts in the United States. In December 2011, the Institute of Cetacean Research (ICR) and Kyodo Senpaku Kaisha, the two Japanese organizations which operate Japan's whaling program, requested an injunction in the US district court in Seattle to stop Sea Shepherd's operations against Japanese whalers. The federal court denied the ICR's preliminary injunction against SSCS. The ICR and Kyodo Senpaku appealed and, on December 17, 2012, the United States Court of Appeals for the Ninth Circuit issued an injunction against Paul Watson and Sea Shepherd and requiring them to stay at least 500 yd (457 m) from ICR vessels. After the court ruling, Paul Watson stepped down and Bob Brown succeeded as the leader of Sea Shepherd, which launched an ultimately rejected appeal to have the injunction set aside. On the appeal's conclusion, the Court of Appeals stated that SSCS's activities were "the very embodiment of piracy". This reversed a previous decision by Richard A. Jones, who was removed as trial judge for abuse of discretion. As a result, Paul Watson and US members of Sea Shepherd are currently prohibited by US courts from approaching Japanese whalers, even if they are observed acting in defiance of international law, including by killing whales in protected waters.

In March 2012, reacting to Paul Watson's allegation that Maltese politicians were bribed by the bluefin tuna industry, Prime Minister of Malta Lawrence Gonzi announced that the government would initiate libel proceedings against the Sea Shepherd founder.

In May 2012, Watson was detained by German authorities after he arrived at the Frankfurt Airport based on a request from the government of Costa Rica on the charge of violating navigational regulations. The charge stemmed from an altercation in 2002 took place during filming for the documentary Sharkwater, in which Sea Shepherd contended that the other vessel was shark finning in Guatemalan waters. Watson subsequently skipped bail and went into hiding. The Costa Rican government subsequently requested the Interpol to issue a Red Notice arrest request for Watson to its member countries.

Watson said on the Discovery Channel in 2009 that the Dalai Lama had sent a letter of support for Sea Shepherd's volunteers accompanied by a wrathful, scowling statue of the deity Hayagriva, which expresses compassion and determination in overcoming obstacles. However, during a visit to Japan in 2010, the Dalai Lama said that while he agrees with the goal of stopping Japan from hunting whales, they should stop using violent methods to achieve that goal.

== In the media ==
Sea Shepherd's campaigns have been documented in the Netflix documentary Seaspiracy, TV series Whale Wars, and TV series Ocean Warriors produced by Animal Planet/Discovery Channel, and in books by current and past members including:

- Laura Dakin, Cookin' Up a Storm: Stories and Recipes from Sea Shepherd's Anti-Whaling Campaigns (March 16, 2015; Book Publishing Company). ISBN 978-1570673122
- Raffaella Tolicetti, Think! Eat! Act!: A Sea Shepherd Chef's Vegan Cookbook (July 24, 2014; Microcosm Publishing). ISBN 9781621066668
- Laurens de Groot, Hunting the Hunters: At War With the Whalers (January 2, 2014; Adlard Coles). ISBN 978-1472903648.
- Rik Scarce, Eco-Warriors: Understanding the Radical Environmental Movement, second revised ed. (1990; Left Coast Press, 2005), Ch. 6. ISBN 978-1-59874-028-8
- Paul Watson, Seal Wars: Twenty-five Years in the Front Lines with the Harp Seals (2002; Firefly Books, 2003). ISBN 978-1-55297-751-4
- Paul Watson, Ocean Warrior: My Battle to End the Illegal Slaughter on the High Seas (1994; Key Porter Books, 1996). ISBN 978-1-55013-599-2
- David B. Morris, Earth Warrior: Overboard with Paul Watson and the Sea Shepherd Conservation Society (1995; Golden, CO: Fulcrum Publishing). ISBN 1-55591-203-6
- Paul Watson, Earthforce! An Earth Warrior's Guide to Strategy (1993; Los Angeles: Chaco Press). ISBN 0-9616019-5-7
- Paul Watson, Sea Shepherd : My Fight For Whales And Seals (1980; W. W. Norton and Company). ISBN 978-0393335804

== See also ==
- International Convention for the Regulation of Whaling
- Whaling in Japan
- Whaling in the Faroe Islands
- Whaling in Norway
- Whaling in Iceland
- Drift netting
- Shark finning
- Eco-terrorism
- Green anarchism
- Animal rights and the animal rights movement
- Green Scare
- Earth First!
- Conservation law

== External Sites ==
Sea Shepherd website.
