= MY Age of Union =

Vessel of Sea Shepherd Conservation Society

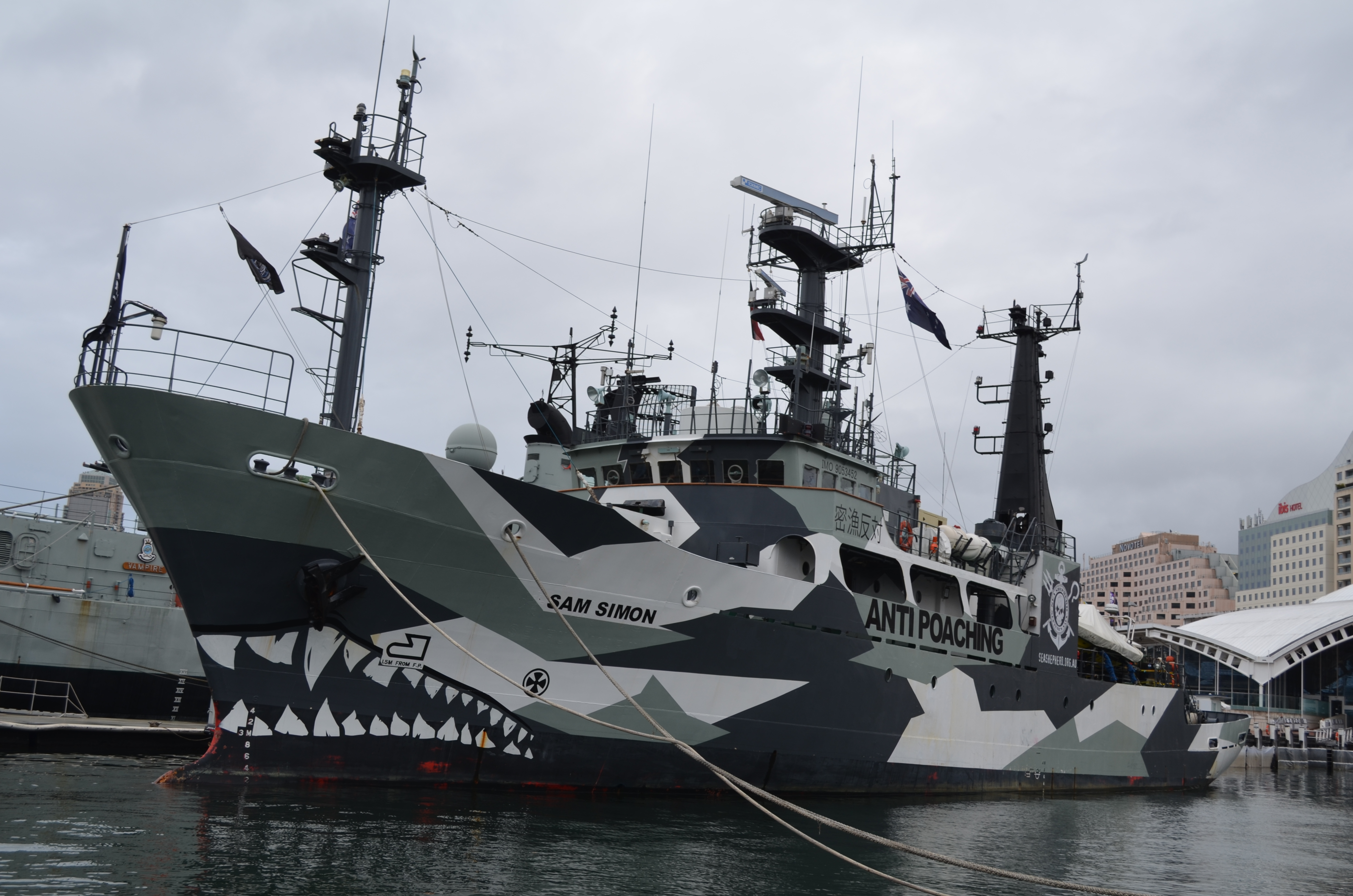
- Age of Union in 2014 as Sam Simon

History

Japan
- Name: Seifu Maru
- Owner: Japan Meteorological Agency
- Operator: Maizuru Marine Observatory
- Builder: Ishikawajima-Harima Heavy Industries Co Ltd
- Yard number: 3035
- Laid down: 6 April 1992
- Launched: 11 August 1992
- Christened: 1993
- Completed: 22 January 1993
- In service: 1993–2010
- Home port: Maizuru, Kyoto
- Identification: IMO number: 9053452
- Fate: Sold in 2010

Japan
- Name: Kaiko Maru No. 8
- Owner: Offshore Operation Co., Ltd
- Acquired: 2010
- In service: 2010–2012
- Renamed: 2010
- Identification: Call sign: JIVB; MMSI number: 572490210
- Fate: Sold in 2012

Tuvalu
- Name: New Atlantis
- Owner: New Atlantis Ventures LLC
- Port of registry: Funafuti
- Acquired: September 2012
- In service: September 2012 – December 2012
- Identification: Call sign: T2FS4; MMSI number: 572490210
- Fate: Management assumed by Sea Shepherd Conservation Society; transferred to Australian register

Australia
- Name: Sam Simon
- Namesake: Sam Simon
- Owner: New Atlantis Ventures LLC
- Operator: Sea Shepherd Conservation Society
- Port of registry: Melbourne, Victoria, Australia
- In service: 2012–2013
- Identification: Call sign: VJN4108
- Status: Re-Flagged to the Netherlands

Netherlands
- Name: 2013–2022: MY Sam Simon; since 2022: MY Age of Union
- Owner: New Atlantis Ventures LLC
- Operator: Sea Shepherd Conservation Society
- Port of registry: Rotterdam, Netherlands
- In service: 2013–present
- Identification: IMO: 9053452; MMSI number: 244810415
- Status: in active service

General characteristics
- Class & type: Research/Survey Vessel
- Tonnage: 484 GT
- Length: 55.5 m (182.1 ft) loa
- Beam: 9.8 m (32.2 ft)
- Draught: 3.50 m (11.48 ft)
- Depth: 4.30 m (14.11 ft)
- Installed power: One 6-cylinder diesel by Akasaka Diesel Ltd, Japan. 1,300 kW (1,800 hp)
- Propulsion: Single shaft; controllable-pitch propeller
- Speed: 12.9 knots (23.9 km/h; 14.8 mph) – 18 knots (33 km/h; 21 mph)
- Capacity: 200 tons fuel
- Crew: 43

MY Age of Union is a vessel of the Sea Shepherd Conservation Society fleet, the ship was previously named after American television producer and writer Sam Simon, who donated the money to purchase the vessel. The ship's identity was kept secret, to be revealed when she met the Japanese whaling fleet in 2012, but was identified when her registration was discovered on the Australian Maritime Safety Authority's list of registered ships.

Age of Union is the former Japanese weather survey ship Kaiko Maru No 8. Sea Shepherd paid the Government of Japan AUD $2,000,000 for the vessel. She was renamed MV New Atlantis shortly before being moved to Brisbane, Queensland. She was subsequently re-registered under the Australian flag as a pleasure craft called Sam Simon.

== Service ==
Age of Union was built by Ishikawajima-Harima Heavy Industries Co Ltd in Tokyo, Japan as Seifu Maru (清風丸, Seifū Maru – meaning cool breeze), a marine meteorological and oceanographic observation ship. The purpose of Seifu Maru and her sister ships was to conduct observations of the pollution affecting the marine environment in the waters around Japan and the western North Pacific, covering greenhouse gases, ozone-depleting substances, heavy metals, and oils. The Japan Meteorological Agency operated five ships: Chofu Maru (長風丸, 1987), Kofu Maru (高風丸, 1988), Seifu Maru (清風丸, 1993), Ryofu Maru (凌風丸, 1995) and Keifu Maru (啓風丸, 2000). Seifu Maru was operated by the Maizuru Marine Observatory and worked in the Sea of Japan. The Japanese ARGO Program (アルゴ計画) was completed and the un-needed vessel was sold to Offshore Operation Co. Ltd and was renamed Kaiko Maru No 8 in 2010.

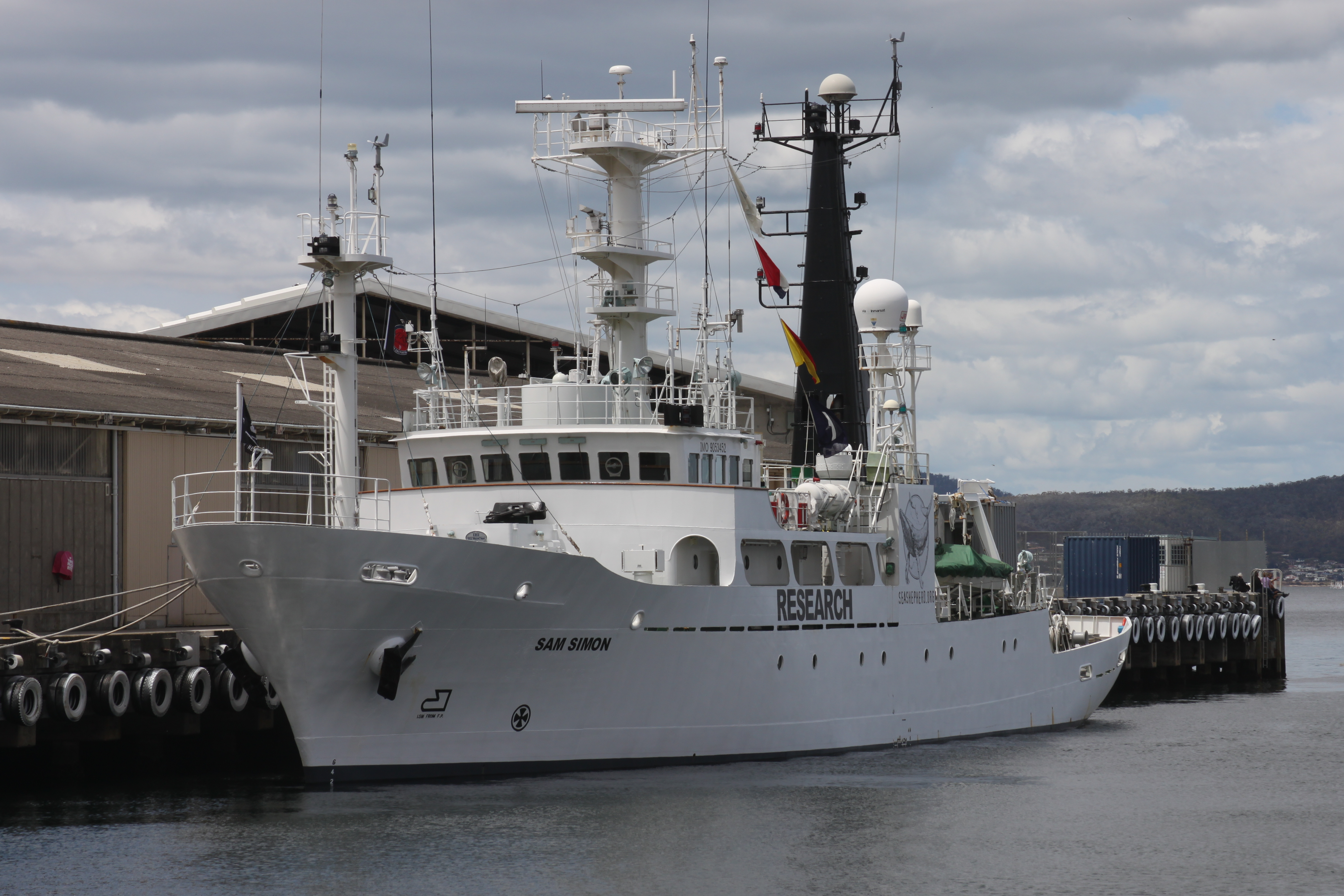
MY Sam Simon in Hobart, Tasmania in December 2012

In September 2012, Kaiko Maru was purchased by New Atlantis Ventures LLC, based in Wilmington, Delaware USA (a shell corporation of Sea Shepherd), and renamed New Atlantis, registered under the flag of Tuvalu. In December 2012, New Atlantis was renamed Sam Simon. $500,000 of upgrades for increased speed and range were undertaken in Brisbane, where she was docked and supplies were taken on board for the voyage to the whale sanctuary. The vessel was publicly unveiled in Hobart, Tasmania in December 2012.

On February 20, 2013, the Japanese whaling ship Nisshin Maru collided with Sam Simon, MY Steve Irwin and MY Bob Barker multiple times in a confrontation in the Southern Ocean, north of Australia's Casey Research Station in Antarctica.

The MY Sam Simon currently operates in Europe and West Africa. In Europe, the Sam Simon crew are filming the activities of trawler type vessels in an attempt to draw attention to dolphin bycatch (dolphins unintentionally caught in the nets of the trawlers). In West Africa, the Sam Simon crew are partnering with several Governments to stop illegal fishing happening within West African waters.

As from 24 May 2021, the MY Sam Simon has been sighted in the Port of Gibraltar for a technical call.

Sam Simon was renamed Age of Union in January 2022 after a $4.5 million donation by Dax Dasilva.
