= MY Bob Barker =

Sea Shepherd Conservation Society ship

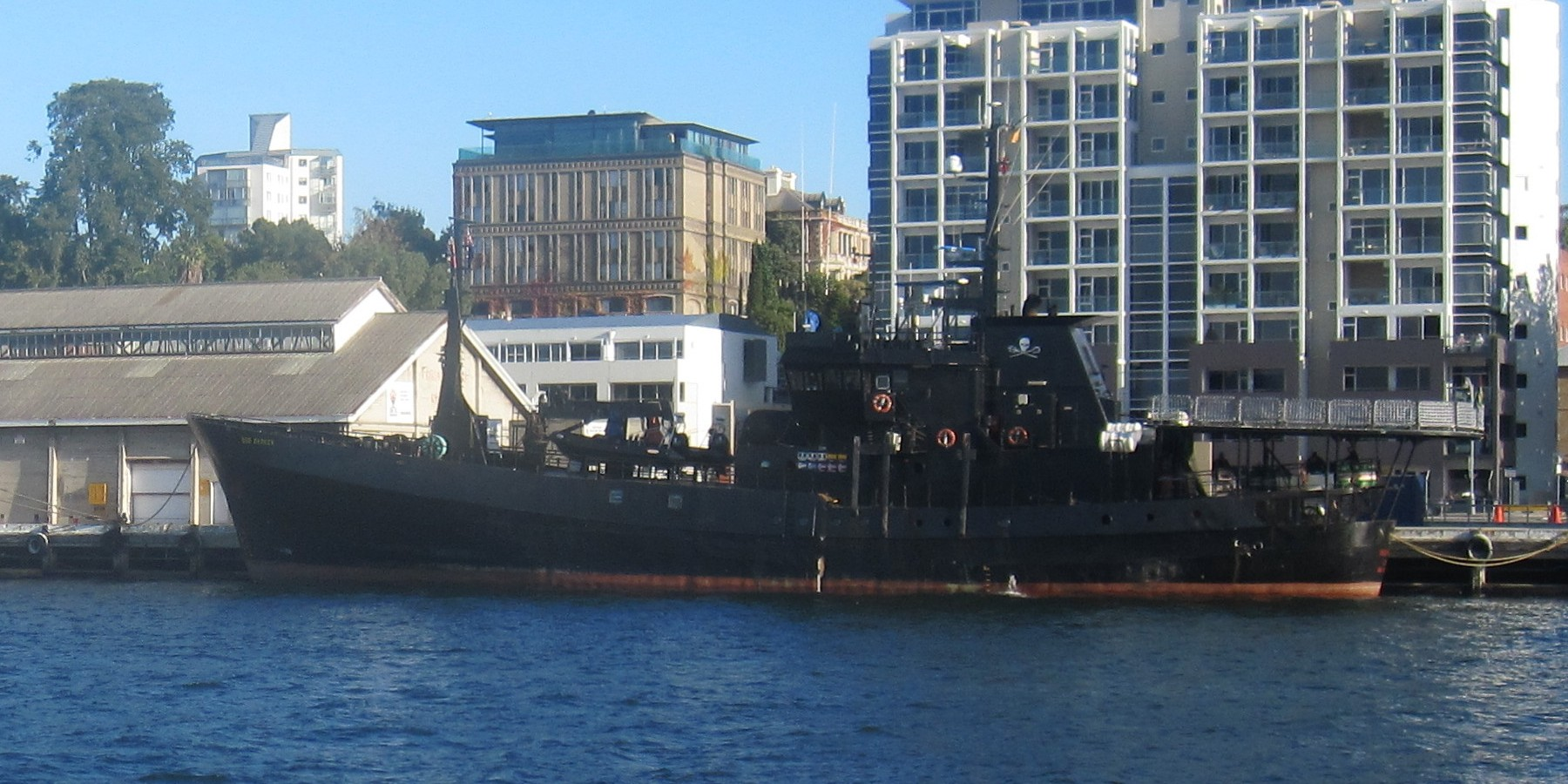
- Bob Barker in port

History

Norway
- Name: Pol XIV
- Owner: Hvalfangerselskap Polaris A/S
- Port of registry: Larvik, Norway
- Builder: Fredrikstad MV, Fredrikstad, Norway
- Yard number: 333
- Launched: 8 July 1950
- In service: 1950
- Out of service: 1966
- Notes: Operated as a whaler until 1962

Norway
- Name: Volstad Jr.
- Owner: Einar Volstad PR
- Port of registry: Ålesund, Norway
- In service: 1966
- Out of service: 1997

Norway
- Name: Verdi (1997–1998); Volstad Jr. (1998–2004)
- Owner: Lafjord Rederi A/S
- Port of registry: Bergen, Norway
- In service: 1997
- Out of service: 2004

Cook Islands
- Name: Polaris
- Owner: Seven Sea Sg Inc
- Port of registry: Rarotonga, Cook Islands
- In service: 2005
- Out of service: 2009

History
- Name: Bob Barker
- Owner: Sea Shepherd Conservation Society
- Port of registry: Togo; (Netherlands) Rotterdam
- In service: 2009
- Out of service: 2022
- Identification: Call sign: 5VBR5; IMO number: 5280540; MMSI number: 51811500; IMO number: 5280540; MMSI number: 246847000
- Fate: Scrapped in Aliağa, Turkey 2022

General characteristics
- Tonnage: 488 GT
- Length: 52.2 m (171 ft 3 in)
- Beam: 9 m (29 ft 6 in)
- Draft: 5.95 m (19 ft 6 in)
- Propulsion: 1 × 3,000 hp (2,200 kW) diesel engine
- Speed: 18 knots (33 km/h; 21 mph)
- Capacity: 540 m^{3} (140,000 US gal) of fuel
- Complement: 20–40

MY Bob Barker was a ship owned and operated by the Sea Shepherd Conservation Society, named after the American television game show host and animal rights activist Bob Barker, whose donation of $5 million to the society facilitated the purchase of the ship. She began operating for the group in late 2009 / early 2010 in its campaign against whaling by Japanese fisheries. In October 2010, Sea Shepherd stated that Bob Barker had completed a major refit in Hobart, Tasmania. Hobart became the ship's honorary home port in 2014.

== History ==
=== Overview ===
Bob Barker is described as a "long-range fast ice" vessel measuring 488 GT It was built in Norway in 1950 as the whale catcher Pol XIV, but was deleted from the Norwegian ship registry in 2004, and sold to a Cook Islands registry concern. It was eventually purchased by the Sea Shepherd Conservation Society and refitted in Africa.

On 19 February 2010, Japanese officials said that Bob Barker's Togo registry had been withdrawn. On 24 May 2010, the Sea Shepherd Conservation Society stated that Bob Barker was now registered under the Dutch flag.

=== Sea Shepherd operations ===
After her African refit, Bob Barker departed Mauritius on 18 December 2009 to join up with the MY Steve Irwin and MY Ady Gil, the two other Sea Shepherd vessels. One of its first actions was to take video footage of the collision between Ady Gil and a Japanese security vessel, after which she took aboard the crew from the stricken Sea Shepherd craft.

On 6 February 2010, while obstructing the slip-way of Nisshin Maru factory ship, Bob Barker collided with Yūshin Maru No. 3, resulting in a 3-foot-4-inch (1.02 m) gash in Bob Barker's hull above the waterline. The Institute of Cetacean Research reported minor damage to a handrail and to the hull of its ship. Both Sea Shepherd and the ICR accused the other of intentionally causing the crash.

On 25 February 2010, Sea Shepherd reported that Bob Barker, which had been following the whaling fleet after Steve Irwin broke off pursuit to return to port, was suffering from a fuel valve problem and would be returning to port, ending the organization's operations for the 2009–2010 whaling season.

On 9 February 2011, Sea Shepherd reported that Bob Barker, which had been searching for the whaling fleet alongside the Sea Shepherd vessel Gojira (Now MV Brigitte Bardot) began blocking Nisshin Maru's slipway. On 18 February 2011, after being aggressively tailed by Bob Barker for over 3,000 nmi (5,556 km), Nisshin Maru changed course and headed towards Japan, cutting short the 2010–11 whaling season.

On 5 March 2012, Sea Shepherd reported that after a lengthy search Bob Barker found the whaling fleet's factory ship, Nisshin Maru. Three days later, on 8 March 2012, the whalers left the Southern Ocean for the 2011–12 season.

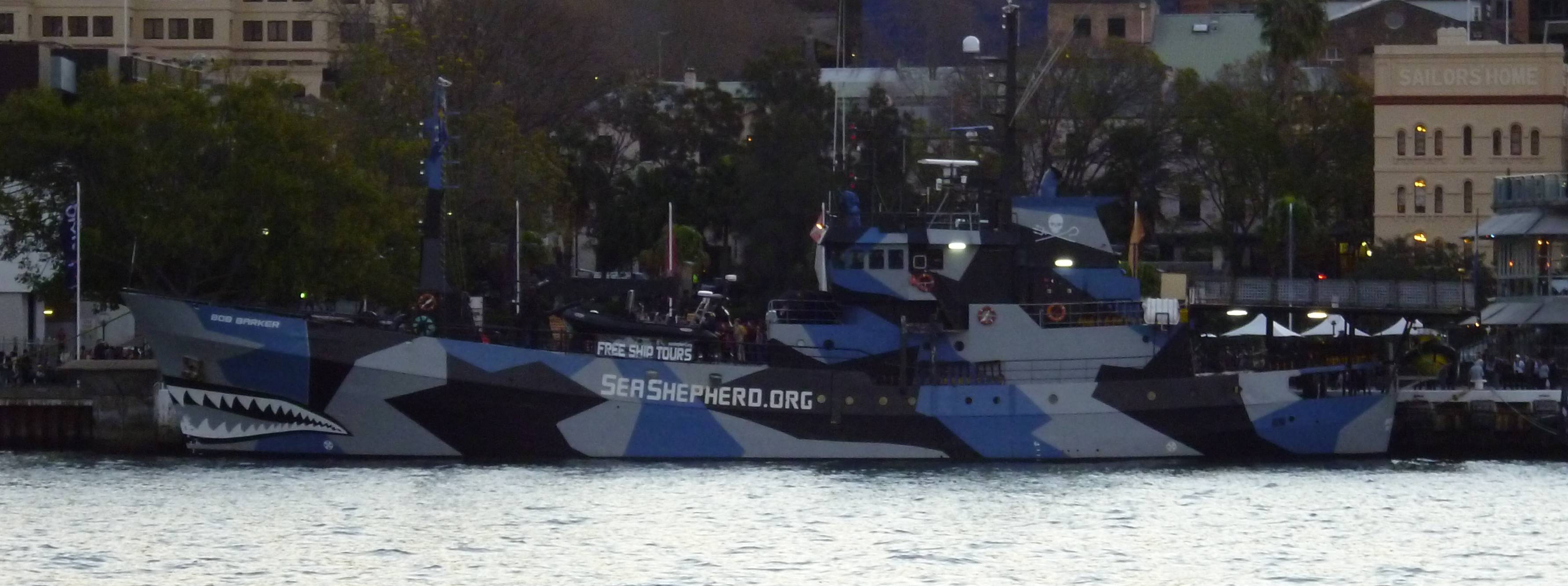
Bob Barker at Circular Quay in Sydney on 9 June 2012, in dazzle camouflage

On 20 February 2013, the Japanese whaling ship Nisshin Maru rammed Bob Barker, MY Sam Simon, Steve Irwin and Sun Laurel multiple times in a confrontation in the Southern Ocean, north of Australia's Casey Research Station in Antarctica. Bob Barker was hit on the stern, with Nisshin Maru's bow knocking down several of Bob Barker's antennas. Bob Barker issued a mayday after losing power.

Following repair from damage, January to March 2014 saw Bob Barker embark on "Operation Relentless" - its last Southern Ocean mission, with a total of 99 days at sea. In February Bob Barker was involved in a collision, this time with Yushin Maru No. 3, resulting in the hull of Bob Barker cracking - though damage did not affect ship operations. Damage was significant enough to be visible to the crew from within the ship. On 31 March 2014, Japan was sued by Australia before the International Court of Justice because of its international responsibility for the Institute of Cetacean Research and parent company Kyoto Senpaku, forcing both companies to suspend operations.

However, advances in the radar technologies of whaling fleets made it increasingly difficult for Bob Barker to find and pursue whaling fleets. From 2016 until its retirement in 2022, Bob Barker operated a range of campaigns in West Africa in partnership with several African countries. These campaigns are meant to bring an end to illegal fishing in West African waters. On 12 November 2022, Bob Barker was retired from the Sea Shepherd fleet and sent to Turkey for recycling.
