= List of ships built by Hall, Russell & Company =

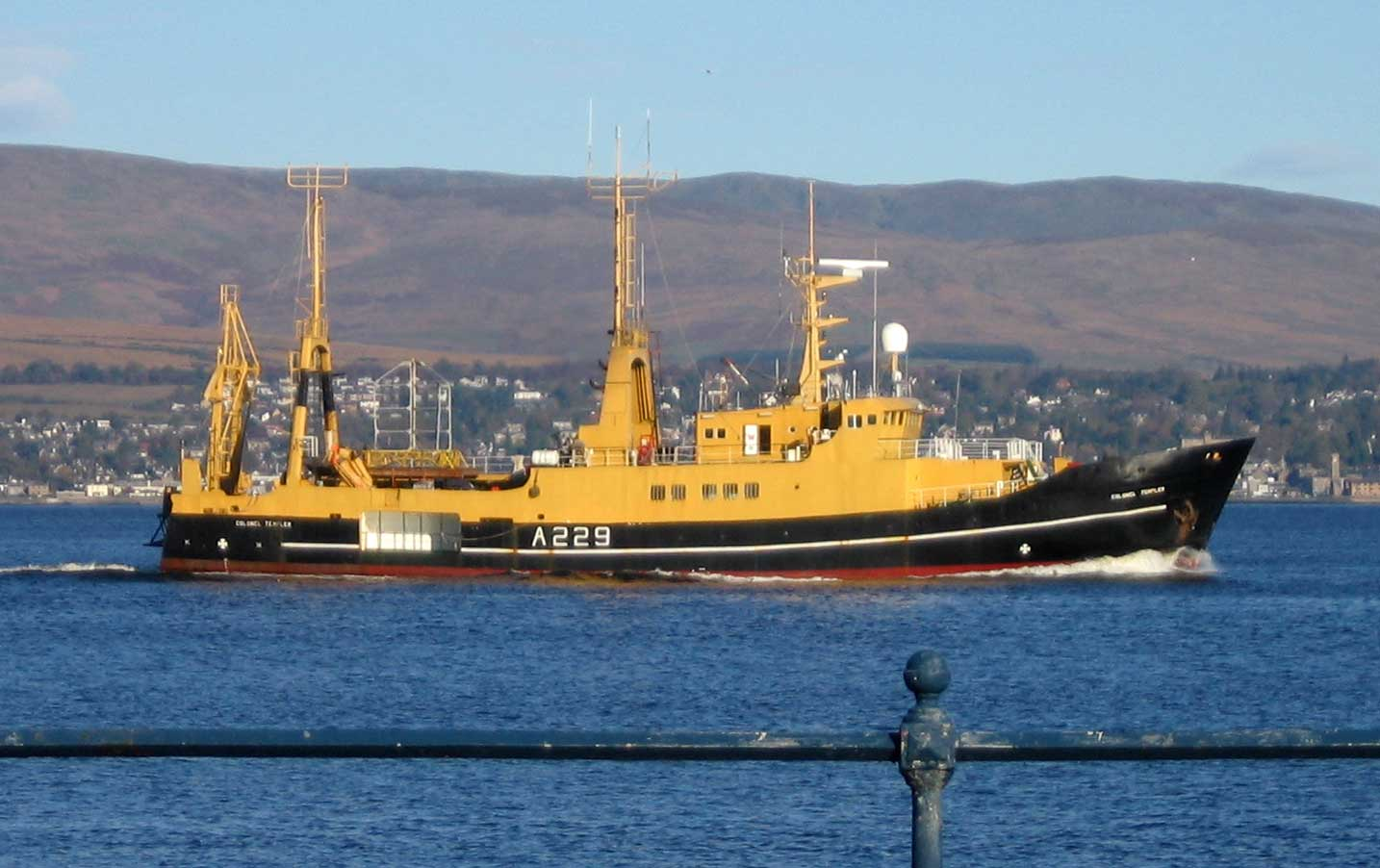
RMAS Colonel Templer, built by Hall Russell in 1966 as a trawler

This is an incomplete list of ships built by Hall, Russell & Company.

== Flower-class Corvettes ==
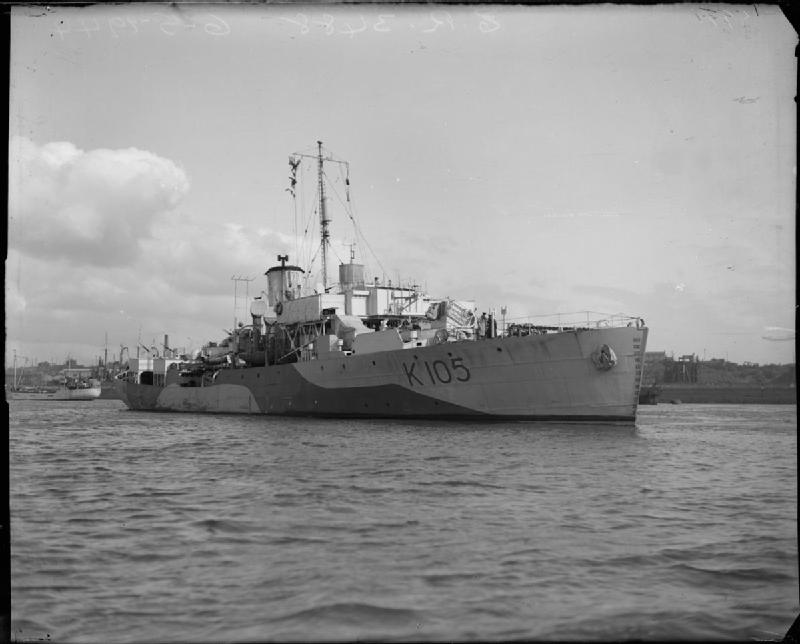
HMS Loosestrife

- 754 HMS Marguerite (K54) 1940
- 755 HMS Marigold (K87) 1941
- 756 HMS Mignonette (K38) 1941
- 760 HMS Coriander (K183) 1941
- 761 HMS Loosestrife (K105) 1941; renamed Hallsevni

== Island-class Patrol Vessels ==
- 960 FPV Jura 1973 sold and renamed Criscilla
- 962 FPV Westra 1974 (2005-2007 MV Robert Hunter; since 2007: MV Steve Irwin)
- 971 HMS Jersey (P295) 1976, sold 16 Dec 1993 and renamed BNS Shaheed Ruhul Amin
- 972 HMS Orkney (P299) 1977, sold 30 April 1999 and renamed TTS Nelson (CG20)
- 973 HMS Shetland (P298) 1977, sold 19 Feb 2003 and renamed BNS Kapatakhaya
- 974 HMS Guernsey (P297) 1977, sold Jan 2004 and renamed BNS Sangu
- 975 HMS Lindisfarne (P300) 1978, sold Jan 2004 and renamed BNS Turag
- 983 HMS Anglesey (P277) 1979, sold 2002 and renamed BNS Gomati
- 984 HMS Alderney (P278) 1979, sold 2002 and renamed BNS Karotoa

== Castle-class Patrol Vessels ==
- 985 HMS Leeds Castle (P258) 1980. Sold to Bangladesh Navy, April 2010 as BNS Dhaleshwari and reclassified as corvette after upgradation.
- 986 HMS Dumbarton Castle (P265) 1982. Sold to Bangladesh Navy, April 2010 as BNS Bijoy and reclassified as corvette after upgradation.

== Hong Kong Patrol Craft (HKPC) ==
HMS Starling (P241) at Hall, Russell & Co., Aberdeen

- 988 HMS Peacock (P239) 1983 (now BRP Emilio Jacinto (PS-35))
- 989 HMS Plover (P240) 1984 (now BRP Apolinario Mabini (PS-36))
- 990 HMS Starling (P241) 1984 (now BRP Artemio Ricarte (PS-37))
- 991 HMS Swallow (P242) 1984 (now LÉ Ciara (P42))
- 992 HMS Swift (P243) 1984 (now LÉ Orla (P41))

== Mooring and Salvage Vessels ==
- 979 MV Tornado 1979 torpedo retrieval
- 993 RMAS Salmoor (A185) 1985
- 994 RMAS Salmaster (A186) 1985
- 995 RMAS Salmaid (A187) 1986

== Fisheries Research Vessels ==
- 846 MV Sir William Hardy (later Rainbow Warrior) 1955
- 899 RRS Discovery 1962
- 940 FRV Clupea 1968

== Auxiliaries ==
- 931 MV Criscilla (Freezer Stern Trawler) 1966; renamed RMAS Colonel Templer 1979

== Round Table Class Admiralty Trawlers ==
- ??? HMT Sir Gareth (T227) 1942

== Passenger ==
- 244 SS St. Sunniva 1887
- 723 St. Sunniva 1931
- 910 MV Hebrides (1964)
- 911 MV Clansman (1964)
- 912 MV Columba 1964 (now MV Hebridean Princess)
- 963 St. Ola 1974
- 997 St. Sunniva 1987 (conversion of 1972 Djursland/Panther)

== Cargo ==
- SS Collynie, 1892 - Steel collier schooner - Ship’s owner Mr Todd Moffatt, Aberdeen, Collision with SS Girnigoe and sunk approaching Aberdeen Harbour 3 May 1897.
- 773 SS Edenwood, 1943 – Constantine Lines, Middlesbrough
- 776 SS Avonwood, 1944 – Constantine Lines, Middlesbrough
- 781 SS Corfen, 1944 – William Cory & Sons
- 785 SS Firebeam, 1945 – Gas Light and Coke Company
- 788 SS Sir Joseph Swan, 1945 – London Power Company
- 750 SS Winga, 1957 – Glen & Company Ltd, Glasgow
- 856 MV Rona, 1956 – Colonial Sugar Refinery Co Ltd, Australia
- 857 MV Corsea, 1956 – William Cory & Sons
- MV Silver Harrier, 1970 – Colonial Sugar Refinery Co Ltd, Australia
- 949 MV Thameshaven, 1971 – the largest ship built in Aberdeen
- 1000 RMS St Helena, 1989
- Seaforth Viscount, launched 8 July 1982 from the dry dock due to the construction of the covered slipway. Later renamed Far Viscount and is now the Cape Viscount.

== Passenger/Cargo ==
- 852 MV Bonavista, 1956 - Canadian National Railway Co. for the Newfoundland coastal boat service
- 853 MV Nonia, 1956 - Canadian National Railway Co. for the Newfoundland coastal boat service
- 749 MV Earl of Zetland, 1939 - Ferry, floating restaurant since 1988
