= Guernsey (disambiguation) =

Guernsey usually refers to either:

- Guernsey, the island or, more rarely, the whole jurisdiction of the ten parishes including smaller offshore islands such as Lihou, Jethou and Herm.
- Bailiwick of Guernsey, a Crown dependency composed of the jurisdictions of Guernsey, Alderney and Sark, as well as a number of smaller islands

Guernsey may also refer to:

== Animals ==
- Guernsey cattle, a breed of cattle
- Golden Guernsey, a breed of goats

== People ==
=== People with the surname Guernsey ===
- Frank E. Guernsey (1866–1927), U.S. Representative from Maine (1908–1917)
- Frank Guernsey (tennis) (1917–2008), American tennis player
- George H. Guernsey (1839–1900), American architect from Montpelier, Vermont
- Hugh Guernsey (1892–1992), American politician from Iowa
- John Guernsey (born 1953), American bishop in the Anglican Church in North America
- Lisa Guernsey (born 1971), American early education researcher, author, and former journalist
- Otis Guernsey Jr. (1918–2001), American writer
- Sarah Elizabeth Mitchell Guernsey (1860–1939), Founder of the National Society Daughters of the American Colonists and President General of the Daughters of the American Revolution
- Sherwood Guernsey (born 1946), Massachusetts state representative
- Wellington Guernsey (1817–1885), Irish composer and poet

=== People with the middle name Guernsey ===
- Douglas Guernsey MacAgy (1913–1973) Canadian-born American art historian, curator, museum director, and academic administrator
- Henry Guernsey Hubbard (1850–1899), American horticulturist, botanist, and entomologist
- Stephen Guernsey Cook Ensko (1896–1969), expert on American antique silver

== Places ==
=== United States ===
- Guernsey, Indiana
- Guernsey, Iowa
- Guernsey, Ohio
- Guernsey, Wyoming
- Guernsey County, Ohio
- Guernsey Dam, earthfill dam on the North Platte River in the U.S. State of Wyoming

=== Elsewhere ===
- Guernsey, Saskatchewan, Canada
- Mount Guernsey, an isolated mainly ice-covered mountain on the west coast of the Antarctic Peninsula

== Arts, entertainment, and media ==
- Guernsey (2005 film), Dutch film by Nanouk Leopold
- The Guernsey Literary and Potato Peel Pie Society, 2008 novel
  - The Guernsey Literary and Potato Peel Pie Society (film), 2018 film adaptation

== Clothing ==
- Guernsey (Australian rules football), type of shirt worn by Australian rules football players
- Guernsey (clothing), seaman's knitted woollen sweater, similar to a jersey

== Ships ==
- HMS Guernsey, the name of four ships of the Royal Navy, and two planned ones
  - HMS Guernsey (1696), 50-gun fourth rate ship of the line of the Royal Navy, launched in 1696
  - HMS Guernsey (P297), Island-class offshore patrol vessel of the Bangladesh Navy

== Sport ==
- Guernsey Cricket Board
- Guernsey FA Cup
- Guernsey F.C., association football
- Guernsey RFC, rugby

== Other uses ==
- Guernsey's, an auction house in New York City

== See also ==
- Gersey
- Guerny
