= HMS Orkney =

1976 Island-class patrol vessel

History

United Kingdom
- Name: HMS Orkney
- Namesake: Orkney Islands
- Builder: Hall, Russell & Company, Aberdeen
- Yard number: 972
- Launched: 29 June 1976
- Sponsored by: Lady Troup, wife of Flag Officer Scotland and Northern Ireland
- Commissioned: February 1977
- Identification: Pennant number: P299
- Fate: Sold to Trinidad and Tobago October 2000

Trinidad and Tobago
- Name: TTS Nelson
- Identification: Pennant number: CG20
- Fate: Sold for scrap 2016

General characteristics
- Class & type: Island-class patrol vessel
- Displacement: 1,250 long tons (1,270 t) standard
- Length: 195 ft (59 m) o/a
- Beam: 36 ft (11 m)
- Draft: 14 ft (4.3 m)
- Propulsion: 1 shaft, 2 diesel, 4,380 hp (3,266 kW)
- Speed: 16 knots (30 km/h)
- Range: 11,000 nautical miles (20,000 km) at 11 knots (20 km/h)
- Complement: 35
- Armament: 1 × Bofors 40 mm gun Mark III

HMS Orkney was an Island-class patrol vessel of the Royal Navy. In 2000 she became TTS Nelson of the Trinidad and Tobago Coast Guard. In 2016, the vessel was sold for scrap.

== Construction and British service ==
Orkney was built by Hall, Russell & Company in Aberdeen, launched on 29 June 1976 and commissioned in February of the following year. She was modelled on the ocean-going fishery protection vessels Jura and Westra. As part of the Fishery Protection Squadron, along with her sister ships, she patrolled the waters around the UK (sometimes also Gibraltar) providing protection for Britain's fishing grounds, as well as providing oil and gas platform protection. In 1978, Orkney coordinated the clean-up operation after the tanker Christos Bitas ran aground in the Irish Sea. She helped co-ordinate the search for survivors from the trawler Ocean Monarch off Fair Isle, in 1980 and recovered many of the bodies when the freighter Radiant Med sank off Guernsey in 1984.

In 1993 she became involved in a fishing dispute with France around the Channel Islands. Paid off in April 1999, she was laid up at Portsmouth Dockyard. Following decommissioning, her bell, name board and honours board were presented to Orkney Islands Council.

== Trinidad and Tobago service ==
In 2000, she was sold to the Trinidad and Tobago Defence Force and renamed TTS Nelson. During her residency at the Coast Guard's headquarters in Chaguaramas, she saw little naval service as she experienced mechanical and structural problems due to her age at the time. After sixteen years under the ownership of the Trinidad and Tobago Defence Force, she was sold for scrap in 2016 upon the Coast Guard's reception of her replacement, TTS Nelson II.

== Bibliography ==
- Richardson, Ian (February 2022). "Island Class Offshore Patrol Vessels (OPV)". Marine News Supplement: Warships. 76 (2): S118–S124. ISSN 0966-6958.
