= BNS Gomati =

Patrol vessel in the Bangladesh Navy

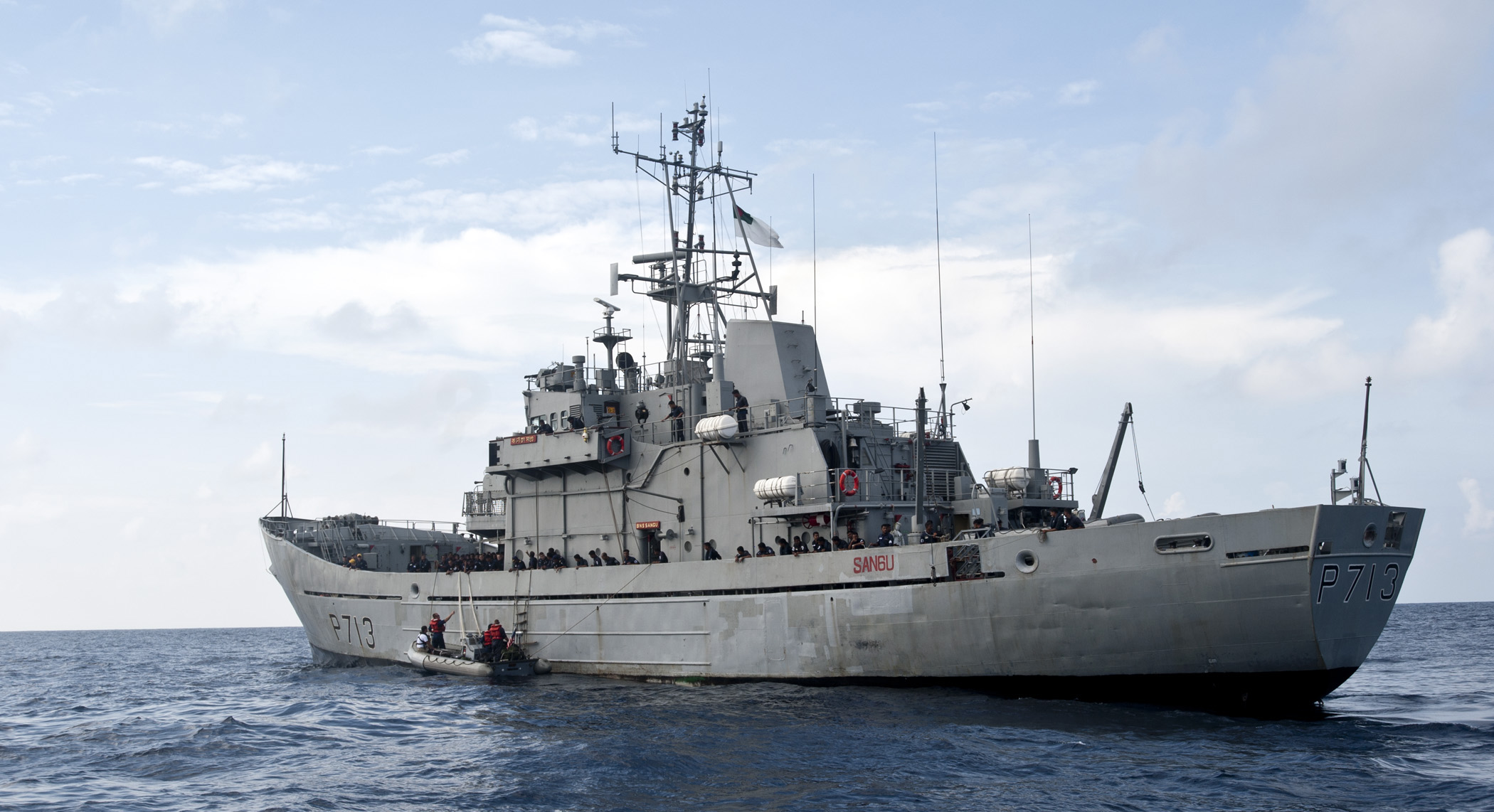
- Sister ship BNS Sangu

History

Bangladesh
- Name: BNS Gomati
- Builder: Hall, Russell & Company, Aberdeen
- Yard number: 983
- Laid down: 6 February 1978
- Launched: 18 October 1978
- Acquired: 12 September 2003
- Commissioned: 3 October 2004
- Home port: Khulna
- Identification: Pennant number: P 914
- Status: in active service

General characteristics
- Class & type: Island-class patrol vessel
- Displacement: 1,260 tons (full load)
- Length: 59.5 m (195 ft)
- Beam: 11 m (36 ft)
- Draught: 4.5 m (15 ft)
- Propulsion: 2 × Ruston 12RKC diesels; 5,640 hp (4,210 kW) sustained; 1 × shaft; cp prop
- Speed: 16.5 knots (30.6 km/h)
- Range: 7,000 nmi (13,000 km; 8,100 mi) at 12 knots (22 km/h; 14 mph)
- Complement: 39
- Sensors & processing systems: Navigation: Kelvin Hughes Type 1006; I-band; Combat Data Systems: Racal CANE DEA-1 action data automation
- Armament: Guns: 1 × Bofors 40 mm/60 Mk 3; 2 × FN 7.62 mm MGs; Countermeasures; ESM: Orange Crop; intercept

BNS Gomati is an Island-class offshore patrol vessel of the Bangladesh Navy. She was originally built as a Fishery Protection Vessel for the British Royal Navy, entering service as HMS Anglesey in 1979. She was sold to Bangladesh in 2002, entering service in 2003.

== Design and description ==
The Island-class was the result in the increase in the United Kingdom's Exclusive economic zone to 200 nautical miles (370 km), with a resulting increase in the requirements to patrol fishing grounds and oil fields. After evaluation of the Scottish Fisheries Protection Agency's fishery protection vessel Jura, built by the shipbuilders Hall, Russell & Company to a trawler-like design, the Royal Navy ordered five ships of the Island-class, based on Jura's design in February 1975, with a further two ships, Anglesey and Alderney on 21 October 1977.

Anglesey was 59.5 metres (195 ft) long overall and 53.6 metres (176 ft) at the waterline, with a beam of 11.0 metres (36.1 ft) and a draught of 4.2 metres (14 ft). Displacement was 1,000 tonnes (980 long tons) normal and 1,280 tonnes (1,260 long tons) deep load. Two Ruston 12 RK 3 CM diesel engines rated at a total of 4,380 brake horsepower (3,270 kW) drove a single propeller shaft, giving a speed of 16 knots (30 km/h; 18 mph), adequate to deal with the majority of trawlers in service in European waters. Range was 11,000 nautical miles (20,000 km; 13,000 mi) at 12 knots (22 km/h; 14 mph). The earlier ships of the class had suffered from excessive motions in high seas, and so Anglesey was fitted with fin stabiliser during build. Armament consisted of a single Bofors 40 mm gun backed up by two machine guns. The ship had a crew of 5 officers and 29 other ranks, plus a detachment of Royal Marines if necessary.

== History ==
HMS Anglesey was laid down at Hall Russell's Aberdeen shipyard on 6 February 1978 and launched on 18 October 1978. She was commissioned into the Royal Navy on 1 June 1979. On commissioning she joined the Offshore Division of the Fishery Protection Squadron. On 13–14 August 1979, the Fastnet yacht race was hit by a severe storm, with Anglesey taking part in the resulting rescue operations, saving seven sailors from the yacht Bonaventure II.

In 2002 she was sold to the Bangladesh Navy.

== Career ==
Gomati transferred on 12 September 2003. On 3 October 2004, she was commissioned into the Bangladesh Navy. She is currently serving under the command of the Commodore Commanding BN Khulna (COMKHUL).

Gomati took part in Exercise Aman in 2013, a multinational exercise held at Karachi port of Pakistan. She visited the port of Colombo, Sri Lanka from 23 to 26 February and Visakhapatnam Port in India from 17 to 20 March 2013 on goodwill missions.

== See also ==
- List of active ships of the Bangladesh Navy

== Bibliography ==
- Brown, David K.; Moore, George (2012). Rebuilding the Royal Navy: Warship Design Since 1945. Barnsley, UK: Seaforth Publishing. ISBN 978-1-84832-150-2.
- Couhat, Jean Laybayle; Baker, A. D., eds. (1986). Combat Fleets of the World 1986/87: Their Ships, Aircraft and Armament. Annapolis, Maryland: Naval Institute Press. ISBN 0-85368-860-5.
- Preston, Antony (1995). "United Kingdom". In Chumbley, Stephen (ed.). Conway's All the World's Fighting Ships 1947-1995. Annapolis, Maryland: Naval Institute Press. pp. 479–543. ISBN 1-55750-132-7.
- Richardson, Ian (February 2022). "Island Class Offshore Patrol Vessels (OPV)". Marine News Supplement: Warships. 76 (2): S118–S124. ISSN 0966-6958.
