= Alderney (disambiguation) =

Alderney (Aurigny) is an island in the Channel Islands.

Alderney may also refer to:

- Alderney, Dorset
- States of Alderney, parliament and council of the island
- Air Alderney, airline serving the island
- Alderney cattle, an extinct breed of dairy cattle
- HMS Alderney, multiple ships
- Alderney, a fictional state, based on New Jersey, appearing in the video game Grand Theft Auto IV
- Alderney, a fictional Wombles character in children's novels and TV series
