= BNS Kapatakhaya =

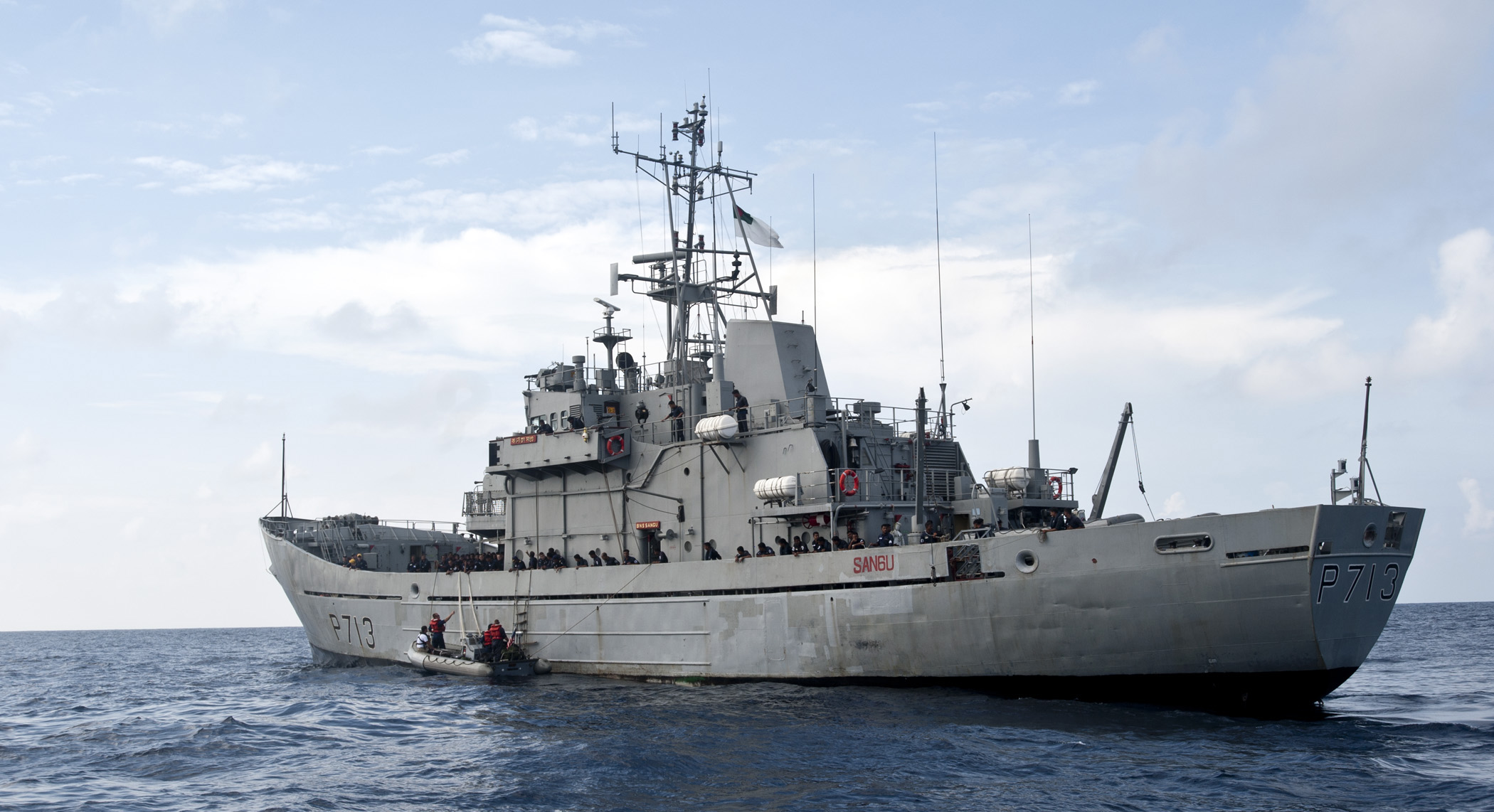
- Sister ship BNS Sangu

History

Bangladesh
- Name: Kapatakhaya
- Namesake: Kapotaksha River
- Builder: Hall, Russell & Company, Aberdeen
- Yard number: 973
- Launched: 22 October 1976
- Acquired: 31 October 2002
- Commissioned: 4 May 2003
- Home port: Khulna
- Identification: Pennant number: P 912
- Status: in active service

General characteristics
- Class & type: Island-class patrol vessel
- Displacement: 1,260 tons (full load)
- Length: 59.5 m (195 ft)
- Beam: 11 m (36 ft)
- Draught: 4.5 m (15 ft)
- Propulsion: 2 × Ruston 12RKC diesels; 5,640 hp (4,210 kW) sustained; 1 × shaft; cp prop
- Speed: 16.5 knots (30.6 km/h)
- Range: 7,000 nmi (13,000 km; 8,100 mi) at 12 kn (22 km/h; 14 mph)
- Complement: 39
- Sensors & processing systems: Surface Search and navigation: Kelvin Hughes Type 1006 radar; I-band; Combat Data Systems: Racal CANE DEA-1 action data automation
- Armament: Guns: 1 × Bofors 40 mm/60 Mk 3; 2 × FN 7.62 mm machine guns; Countermeasures; ESM: Orange Crop; intercept

BNS Kapatakhaya is an Island-class offshore patrol vessel of the Bangladesh Navy. She entered service with the Bangladesh Navy in 2003.

== History ==
Built by Hall, Russell & Company, she was modelled on the ocean-going trawlers FPV Jura (1973) and FPV Westra (1974). The vessel was laid down in 1975 and launched on 22 October 1976. She was commissioned into the Royal Navy as HMS Shetland (P298) on 14 July 1977. In 2002 she was sold to the Bangladesh Navy.

== Career ==
Kapatakhaya transferred on 31 July 2002. On 4 May 2003, she was commissioned into the Bangladesh Navy. She is currently serving under the command of the Commodore Commanding BN Khulna (COMKHUL).

BNS Kapatakhaya took part in Exercise Shomudro Torongo, a joint bilateral exercise with the Royal Navy at Ganges delta region in Bangladesh from 29 April to 3 March 2009.

BNS Kapatakhaya participated in Exercise Milan, a biennial multilateral exercise at Andaman Islands in India in February 2010.

== See also ==
- List of active ships of the Bangladesh Navy

== Bibliography ==
- Richardson, Ian (February 2022). "Island Class Offshore Patrol Vessels (OPV)". Marine News Supplement: Warships. 76 (2): S118–S124. ISSN 0966-6958.
