= BNS Turag =

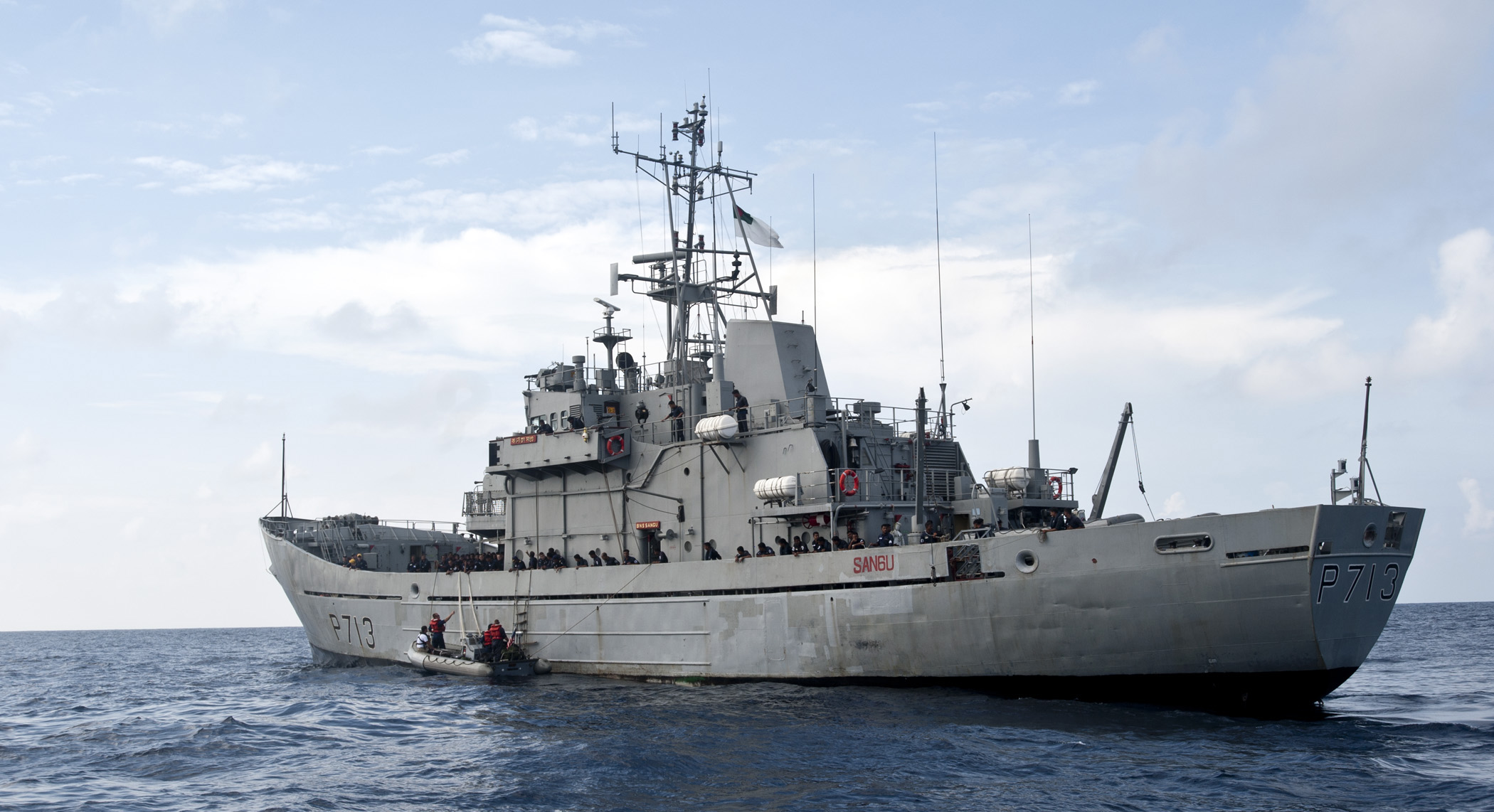
- Sister ship BNS Sangu

History

Bangladesh
- Name: Turag
- Namesake: Turag River
- Builder: Hall, Russell & Company, Aberdeen
- Yard number: 975
- Launched: 1 June 1977
- Acquired: 2004
- Commissioned: 3 October 2004
- Home port: Khulna
- Identification: Pennant number: P 714
- Status: in active service

General characteristics
- Class & type: Island-class patrol vessel
- Displacement: 1,260 tons (full load)
- Length: 59.5 m (195 ft)
- Beam: 11 m (36 ft)
- Draught: 4.5 m (15 ft)
- Propulsion: 2 × Ruston 12RKC diesels; 5,640 hp (4,210 kW) sustained; 1 × shaft; cp prop
- Speed: 16.5 knots (30.6 km/h)
- Range: 7,000 nautical miles (13,000 km; 8,100 mi) at 12 knots (22 km/h; 14 mph)
- Complement: 39
- Sensors & processing systems: Surface Search and Navigation: Kelvin Hughes Type 1006 radar; I-band; Combat Data Systems: Racal CANE DEA-1 action data automation
- Armament: Guns: 1 × Bofors 40 mm/60 Mk 3; 2 × FN 7.62 mm machine guns; Countermeasures; ESM: Orange Crop; intercept

BNS Turag is an Island-class offshore patrol vessel of the Bangladesh Navy. She has been serving in the Bangladesh Navy since 2004.

== Construction and service ==
Built by Hall, Russell & Company, she was modelled on the ocean-going trawlers FPV Jura (1973) and FPV Westra (1974). She was launched on 1 June 1977. She was commissioned to Royal Navy as HMS Lindisfarne (P300) on 3 March 1978.

=== Royal Navy ===
On 27 March 1980, the Accommodation platform Alexander L. Kielland capsized in the Ekofisk oil field in the North Sea, killing 123. Lindisfarne took part in the search for survivors following the accident, steaming 180 miles to reach the site of the accident. Lindisfarne found no survivors, but helped to ferry bodies found by other search vessels to the main production rig.

On 29 January 2004, she was sold to the Bangladesh Navy.

=== Bangladesh ===
BNS Turag reached Mongla Naval Base in May 2004 after an 8,000 mile journey from the UK. The ship made brief stopovers at Tangier port in Morocco, Port Said in Egypt, Jeddah in Saudi Arabia, Port of Salalah in Oman and Port of Colombo in Sri Lanka as goodwill visits as well as to replenish rations, fuel and provisions. The ship was commissioned on 3 October 2004 under the command of the Commodore Commanding Khulna (COMKHUL). About 100 personnel serve on board her.

BNS Turag took part in 7th International Maritime Defence Exhibition (IMDEX) Asia-2009 in Singapore and Weapon Multinational Exercise in South China Sea in May 2009. She also visited port of Penang, Malaysia in a goodwill visit.

On 10 September 2018, fishing trawler Swadhin-3 sank near Mongla port after a collision with a commercial vessel. 12 fishermen were on board the fishing trawler. BNS Turag responded quickly to rescue 9 fishermen alive.

== See also ==
- List of active ships of the Bangladesh Navy

== Bibliography ==
- Richardson, Ian (February 2022). "Island Class Offshore Patrol Vessels (OPV)". Marine News Supplement: Warships. 76 (2): S118–S124. ISSN 0966-6958.
