= HMS Alderney =

Five ships of the Royal Navy have been called HMS Alderney, named after the Island of Alderney.

- HMS Alderney (1735) was an 8-gun bomb vessel launched in 1735 and hulked in 1741.
- HMS Alderney (1743) was a 24-gun sixth rate, originally built as HMS Squirrel but renamed in 1742 and launched in 1743. She was sold in 1749.
- HMS Alderney (1757) was a 12-gun sloop launched in 1757 and sold in 1783. She may have become the whaler Alderney, taken by the Spanish in 1797.
- HMS Alderney (P416) was an Amphion-class submarine launched in 1945 and broken up in 1972.
- HMS Alderney (P278) was an Island-class patrol vessel, launched in 1979 and decommissioned in 2001. She was sold to the Bangladesh Navy in 2002 and renamed Karotoa.
