= HMS Guernsey =

Four ships of the Royal Navy have borne the name HMS Guernsey, after the island of Guernsey. Two more were planned but never completed:

- HMS Guernsey (1660) was a 22-gun ship launched as Basing in 1654, and renamed HMS Guernsey in 1660. She was converted to a fireship in 1688 and broken up in 1693.
- HMS Guernsey (1696) was a 48-gun fourth rate launched in 1696. She was rebuilt in 1740, hulked in 1769 and sold in 1786.
- HMS Guernsey (1800) was a 32-gun fifth rate launched in 1758 as Aeolus (though the name sometimes appears as Eolus). She was placed on harbour service in 1796, renamed HMS Guernsey in 1800 and broken up in 1801.
- HMS Guernsey was to have been a wooden screw sloop. She was ordered in 1861 and cancelled in 1863.
- HMS Guernsey was to have been a destroyer. She was ordered as HMS Gael in 1944, but was cancelled in 1945.
- HMS Guernsey (P297) was an Island-class patrol vessel launched in 1977, paid off in 2003 and sold to Bangladesh in 2004 where she was renamed BNS Sangu.
