= Scottish Fisheries Protection Agency =

UK government agency

Executive Agency overview
- Dissolved: 1 April 2009
- Superseding Executive Agency: Marine Scotland
- Jurisdiction: Scotland
- Headquarters: Edinburgh

Ensign of the Scottish Fisheries Protection Agency

The Scottish Fisheries Protection Agency (SFPA) was an Executive Agency of the Scottish Government. On 1 April 2009, the Scottish Fisheries Protection Agency and Fisheries Research Services were merged with the Scottish Government Marine Directorate to form Marine Scotland, part of the core Scottish Government.

The SFPA was responsible for both deterring illegal fishing in Scottish waters, as well as monitoring the compliance of the fisheries industry in Scotland with the relevant Scottish and European Union laws on fisheries. The Agency had 18 Fishery Offices, a fleet of 3 Fishery Protection Vessels, and 2 aircraft for the purposes of monitoring and enforcement in the waters around Scotland. The letters "SF" that appeared in the Agency's ensign relate to the words "Sea Fisheries" as the agency was part of the UK Sea Fisheries Inspectorate (SFI).

== History ==
The Parliament of the United Kingdom has legislated for the protection and control of fisheries in the waters around the United Kingdom since the early 19th century. In the early 19th century, the Commissioners of the British White Herring Fishery were appointed, who had the power to detail naval vessels to superintend the herring fisheries; officers of the fishery were appointed with particular emphasis on the certification of cured herring for export and for making the necessary brand on the barrel. Experience as a cooper – a maker of barrels – remained a qualification for Fishery Officers until as recently as 1939.

In 1882, the Fishery Board for Scotland was established for the purposes of protecting sea fisheries in the waters around Scotland and land-based inspection of landed catches. By 1909, the Board's fleet included 5 steam vessels; at the outbreak of the Second World War, the fleet had been increased to 8 vessels which included 2 small motor boats. The Board's responsibilities were transferred to the Secretary of State for Scotland in 1939.

In April 1991, the Secretary of State for Scotland established the fisheries protection and enforcement services as an executive agency as part of the Government's Next Steps Initiative, which sought to devolve specific activities from central Government to free-standing organisations, headed by Chief Executives accountable to Ministers. Hence, the Scottish Fisheries Protection Agency was established as an executive agency of the Scottish Office with the resources of 230 staff, 20 coastal offices, 6 protection vessels and 2 surveillance aircraft. Following devolution in Scotland, the agency transferred to the control of the Scottish Executive Environment and Rural Affairs Department (SEERAD).

In 2007, the Scottish National Party (SNP) changed the structure of the Scottish Executive (now known as the Scottish Government), and the SFPA became associated with the Director-General of the Environment. In April 2009, the SFPA officially ceased to exist, with its duties being absorbed into the newly established Marine Scotland.

== Responsibilities ==
The SFPA was responsible for monitoring compliance and taking enforcement action, where necessary, to deter and detect illegitimate activities in the marine environment.

== Resources ==
=== SFPA Headquarters ===
The Headquarters of the SFPA was located in Pentland House, Edinburgh. It housed the supporting arms of the Agency including Finance, Corporate Affairs, Human Resources, Training, Pay, Procurement and Health & Safety as well as the Prosecution & Enforcement Policy branch and the Marine Monitoring Centre (previously known as the HQ Operations).

==== Marine Monitoring Centre and UKFCC ====
The Marine Monitoring Centre was responsible for tasking SFPA assets, primarily FPVs and surveillance aircraft, to address the key priorities, which were determined using risk-based analysis. The Marine Monitoring Centre also acted as part of the UK Fisheries Monitoring Centre, maintaining and monitoring the VMS satellite tracking system of all fishing vessels in Scottish waters and Scottish fishing vessels globally. The MMC was staffed 24/7.

From 1 June 2005, the UK Fisheries Call Centre (UKFCC), based within the MMC, has been the single point of contact for all notification or reporting requirements from fishing vessels in UK waters, working of behalf of Marine Scotland Compliance, the Marine Fisheries Agency of England and Wales (MFA), and the Department of Agriculture and Rural Development of Northern Ireland (DARNDI).

The MMC & UKFCC had approximately 13 staff.

=== Staff ===
The SFPA employed 285 staff, in the following areas:

Marine Surveillance – 134 Coastal Inspection – 124 Headquarters – 27

Although the SFPA owned two surveillance aircraft, the air crews were provided by a private Company on a contract basis.

All staff employed directly by the SFPA were Civil Servants and subject to Civil Service terms and conditions of employment.

=== Coastal Inspection ===
The Marine staff were responsible for crewing the three Marine Protection Vessels, with each Vessel having two crews who operated on the basis of 3 weeks on duty followed by 3 weeks off duty. Further details of the Vessels and their crewing arrangements can be found in the 'Ships' page of this section of the website.

Coastal Inspection

The Coastal Inspection staff, who made up the Sea Fisheries Inspectorate, were split into two Areas – North / East and South / West – the split of Fishery Offices in each area is provided below:

- FO Eyemouth
- FO Pittenweem
- FO Aberdeen
- FO Peterhead
- FO Fraserburgh
- FO Buckie
- FO Scrabster
- FO Kirkwall
- FO Lerwick
- FO Kinlochbervie
- FO Lochinver
- FO Ullapool
- FO Stornoway
- FO Portree
- FO Mallaig
- FO Oban
- FO Campbeltown
- FO Ayr

The main tasks for the Coastal SFI was to ensure the integrity of the Quota Management System and the enforcement of regulations on effort limitation, stock recovery programmes, VMS and the Registration of Buyers and Sellers act. This was accomplished by:

- Inspections of catches in ports on board vessels, in fish markets and on landing for direct sale.
- Weighing of whitefish catches as required by EU legislation, with catches sample weighed at the point of landing, on fish markets and at merchants’ premises.
- Enforcing the timeous submission of logsheets and landing declarations in compliance with the EU and UK legislation and in the submission of salesnotes and buyers notes, in compliance with the legislation on the registration of sellers and buyers of sea fish.
- Ensuring catches are accurately recorded against quota and that buyers and sellers are complying with the regulations.
- Carrying out post landing investigations in cases where there is reason to suspect that catches were not accurately declared at the time of landing and sale.
- Carrying out audit checks on registered buyers under protocols with the Marine Directorate.
- Enforcing pelagic fisheries regulations by means of tank-dipping prior to landing, or verifying the weights of catches as they are landed through the approved and certified weighing systems.

=== Marine SFI ===
The Marine Sea Fisheries Inspectorate (SFI) consisted of a fleet of 4 Fishery Protection Vessels (FPVs) in service as of 2009. A fleet renewal programme to replace the ageing Sulisker type began in 2003 with the delivery of the first Minna type, followed by the Jura type in 2005. It was originally intended to upgrade the fleet to 3 Jura type vessels and 2 Minna type vessels, however the renewal programme was under review by the Scottish Government.

Scottish FPVs are not military ships and are not armed. They used the prefix FPV, and fly the SFPA's ensign. Scottish FPVs were responsible for the inspection of fishing vessels at sea in Scottish waters and Scottish vessels in the waters of other member states. The high profile of the fleet at sea acted as a deterrent against illegal fishing and is pivotal to the information informing the Real Time Closure (RTC) scheme. FPVs also contribute towards the UK's commitment to NEAFC, with annual patrols in the NEAFC area west of Rockall.

Historically, additional Fishery Protection Vessels were provided by the Fishery Protection Squadron of the Royal Navy which was previously based at Rosyth. In 1994, the Agency determined that this assistance was no longer required and the Fishery Protection Squadron was moved to Portsmouth as part of the Strategic Defence Review (SDR). From that time, all Fishery Protection operations in Scottish waters (with the exception of joint exercises) were conducted by SFPA vessels.

The Marine SFI had approximately 133 staff and had projected running costs of £9,421,000 for 2008–2009

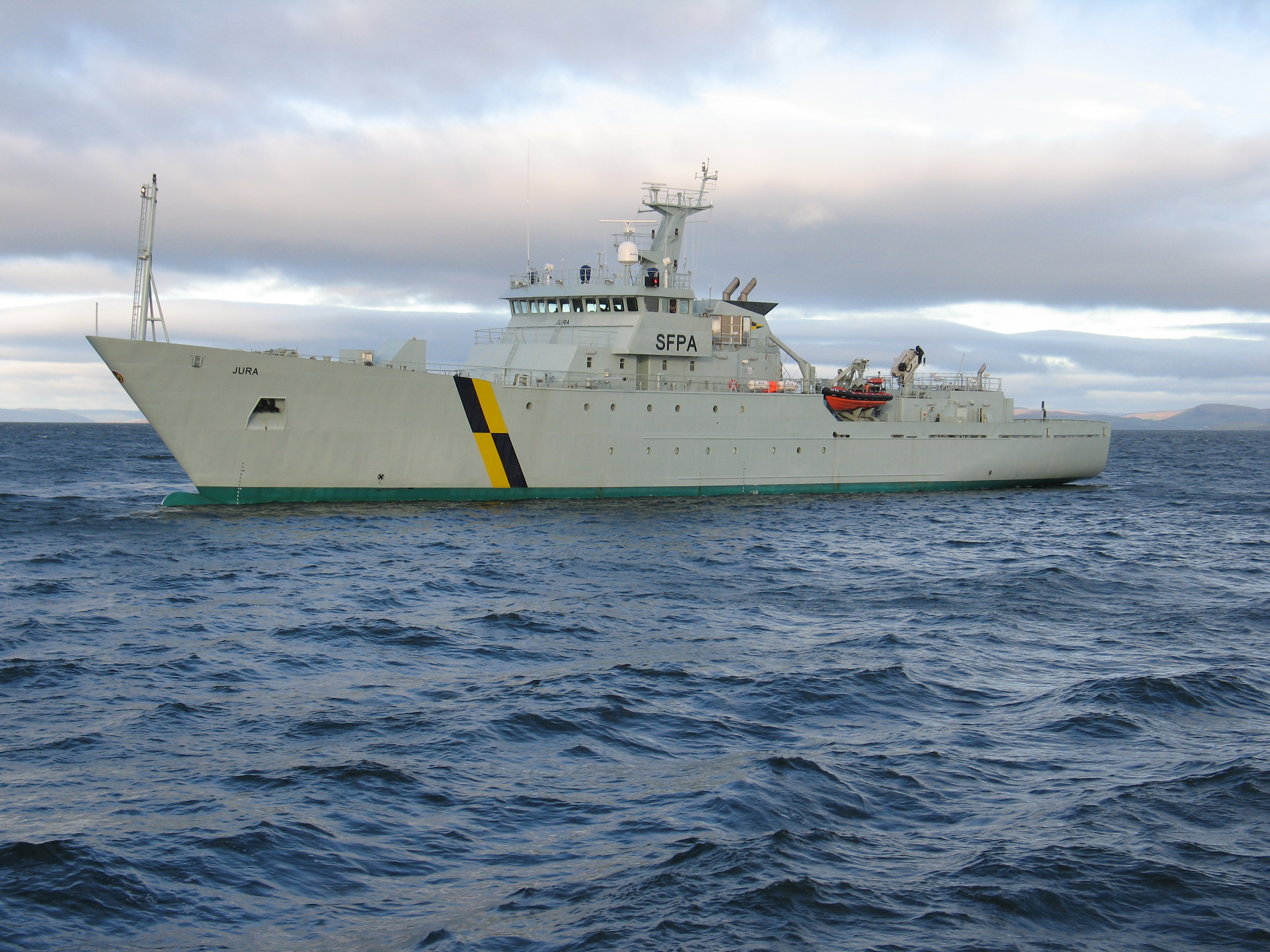
FPV Jura

==== Jura Type ====
The Jura-type offshore patrol vessels were 84m in length with a displacement of 2,200 tonnes. These vessels could stay on effective patrol for up to 30 days although the normal patrol length remains at 21 days. The first vessel of the type, FPV Jura, was constructed by Ferguson Shipbuilders of Port Glasgow, joining the fleet in March 2006.

An earlier FPV Jura was built in 1973 by Hall Russell of Aberdeen, Scotland. Her success on loan to the Royal Navy as HMS Jura led to the building of a further seven Island-class patrol vessels.

In the tendering for the next two Jura-type vessels, the Scottish Executive awarded the contract to a Polish shipbuilder rather than Fergusons, sparking strong criticism from the Scottish National Party. FPV Hirta, was constructed in Remontowa Shipyard, Poland, and launched on 17 August 2007. The vessel joined the fleet in May 2008. Plans to build a third vessel were postponed.

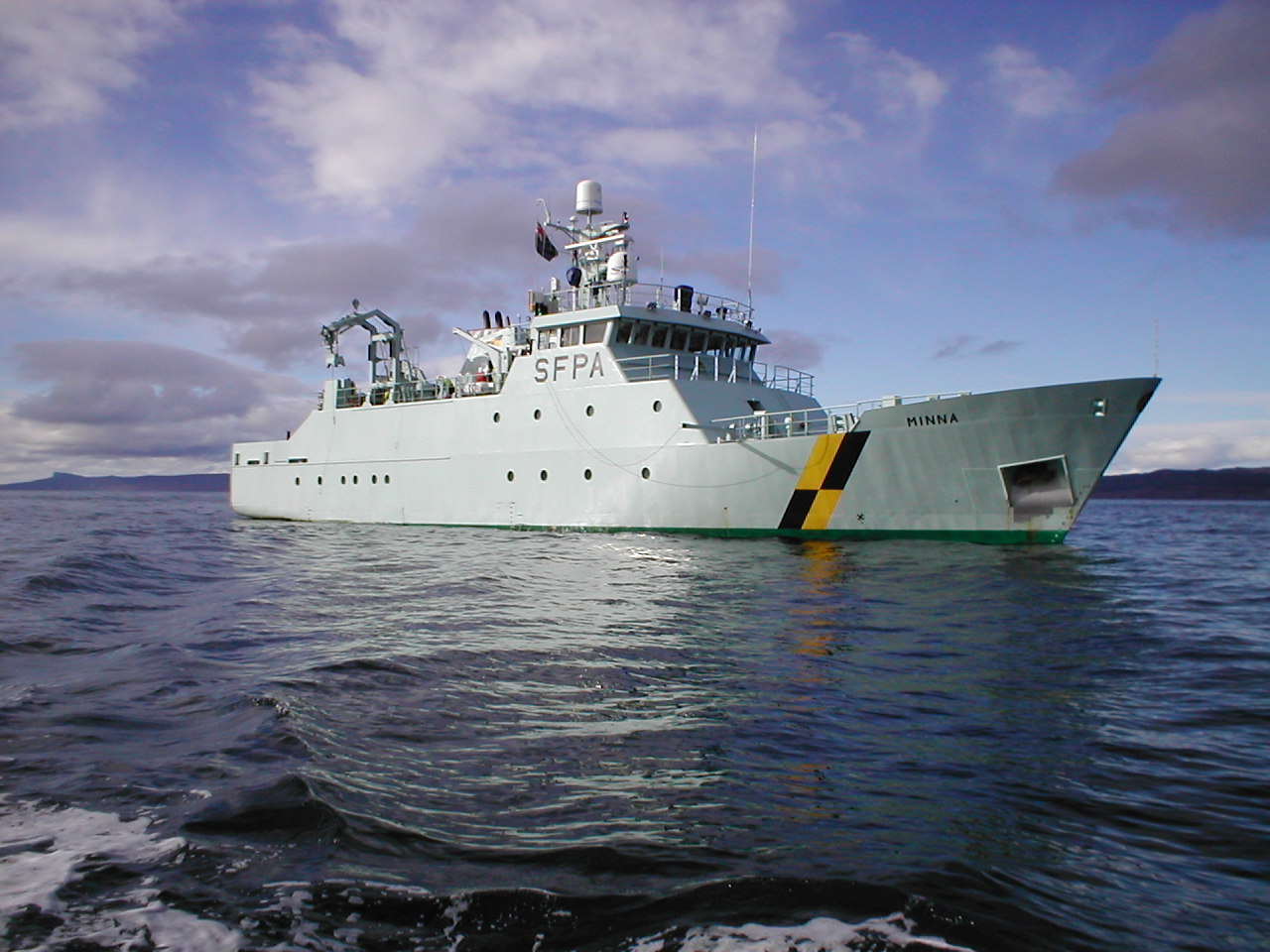
FPV Minna

==== Minna Type ====
The Minna type were inshore/offshore patrol vessels with a displacement of 781 tonnes and a maximum speed of 14 knots. Vessels of this type can also spend up to 21 days on patrol. There was only one vessel of this type, FPV Minna constructed by Ferguson Shipbuilders and launched in 2003.

In May 2006, the vessel replacement programme was delayed, when the SFPA was forced to suspend the tender process for a second Minna type vessel after it was found that the process was in breach of EU procurement rules.

A subsequent tender exercise using consultancy resources rather than Scottish Executive personnel to carry out the procurement activities commenced in early 2007, but was postponed following the May 2007 Scottish Elections and the rise to power of the Scottish National Party.

The current Minna was the third FPV to bear the name (named after a character in Sir Walter Scott's novel The Pirate). Previous vessels of this name served between 1901–1939 and 1939–1974.

==== Historical Types ====
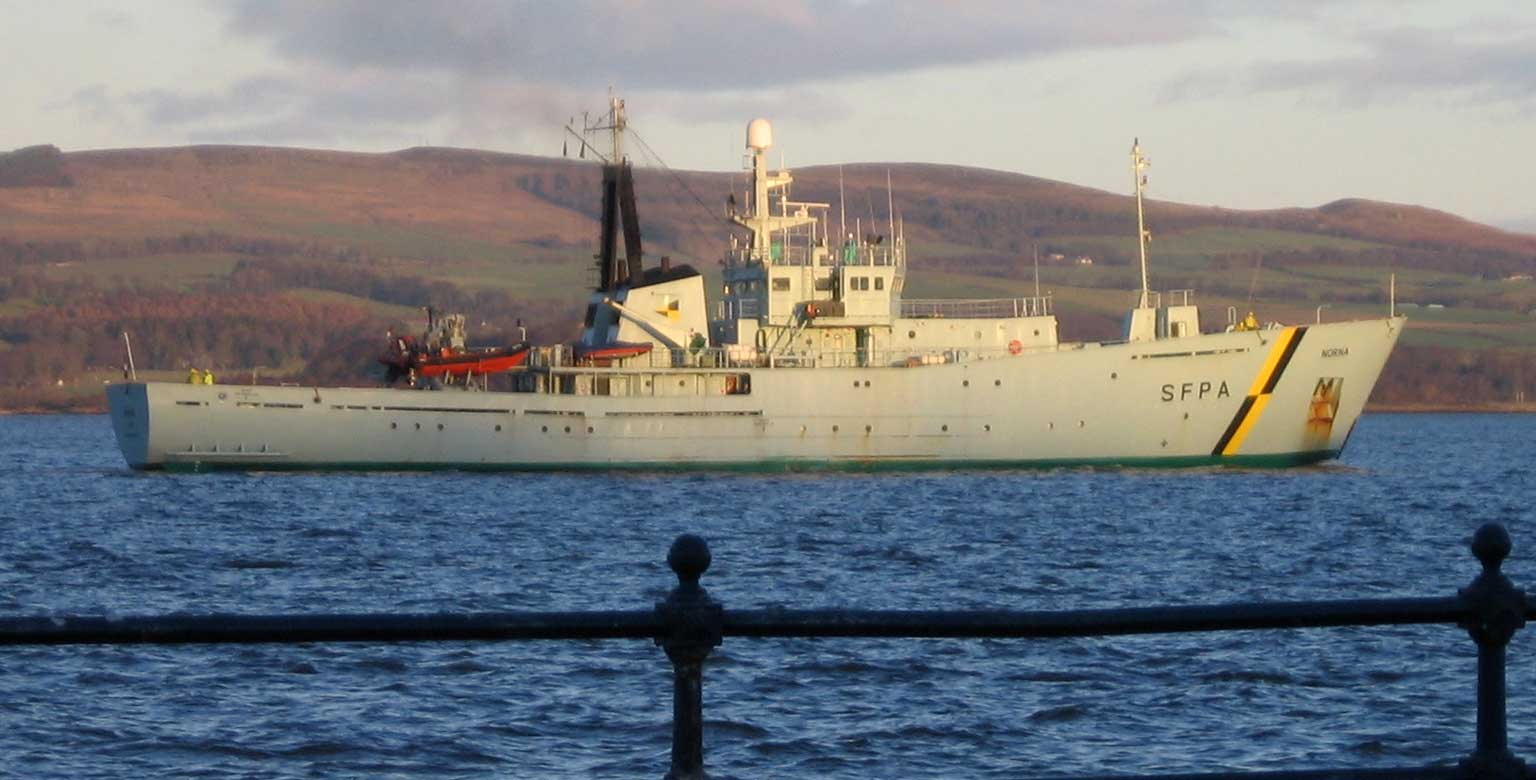
FPV Norna

The Sulisker type were offshore patrol vessels with a displacement of 1,365 tonnes and a maximum speed of 18 knots. They could spend up to 21 days on patrol. The first of the type, FPV Sulisker was launched in 1980, decommissioned late 2006 and is currently undergoing conversion to a luxury yacht in Lowestoft. FPV Vigilant, launched in 1982, was decommissioned in Spring 2008. As of March 2023, Vigilant was re-named John Paul DeJoria II and operated by Neptune's Navy. The last of this type in service was FPV Norna which was launched in 1987 and paid off in October 2010.

The last of the Island type, FPV Westra was launched in 1975 and decommissioned in 2003. The vessel was purchased by Sea Shepherd Conservation Society in 2006 and was renamed MY Robert Hunter in memory of one of the two founding members of Greenpeace. The vessel has since been renamed MY Steve Irwin after the death of the famous conservationist TV personality. The Steve Irwin has become a popularly recognised ship due to the Animal Planet television programme Whale Wars which documents the work of Sea Shepherd including their use of the vessel. The Island type were offshore patrol vessels with a displacement of 1,017 tonnes and a maximum speed of 16.5 knots. In contrast to the more modern vessel types, the Island type could only remain on patrol for 16–18 days.

SFPA marked Cessna F-406 as operated by Highland Airways

=== Aerial Surveillance ===
The SFPA also had two surveillance aircraft, both Reims Vigilant F-406, based at Inverness Airport. The aircraft are operated by Directflight under contract.

The main tasks of the aerial surveillance aircraft are to:

- Validate the UK VMS system
- Monitor the activities of fishing vessels not equipped with VMS (less than 15m length)
- Patrol the increasing number of sea areas closed to fishing operations either to protect fish stocks or the habitats contained within an area.
- Monitor fishing activities in the international waters adjacent to UK fishery limits and under the control of NEAFC, particular to detect and deter IUU fishing.

In 2010, the aircraft were out of service for 6 weeks due to "documentation issues"

== See also ==
- Marine and Fisheries Agency of England and Wales
- Marine Scotland
