= BNS Shaheed Ruhul Amin (1994) =

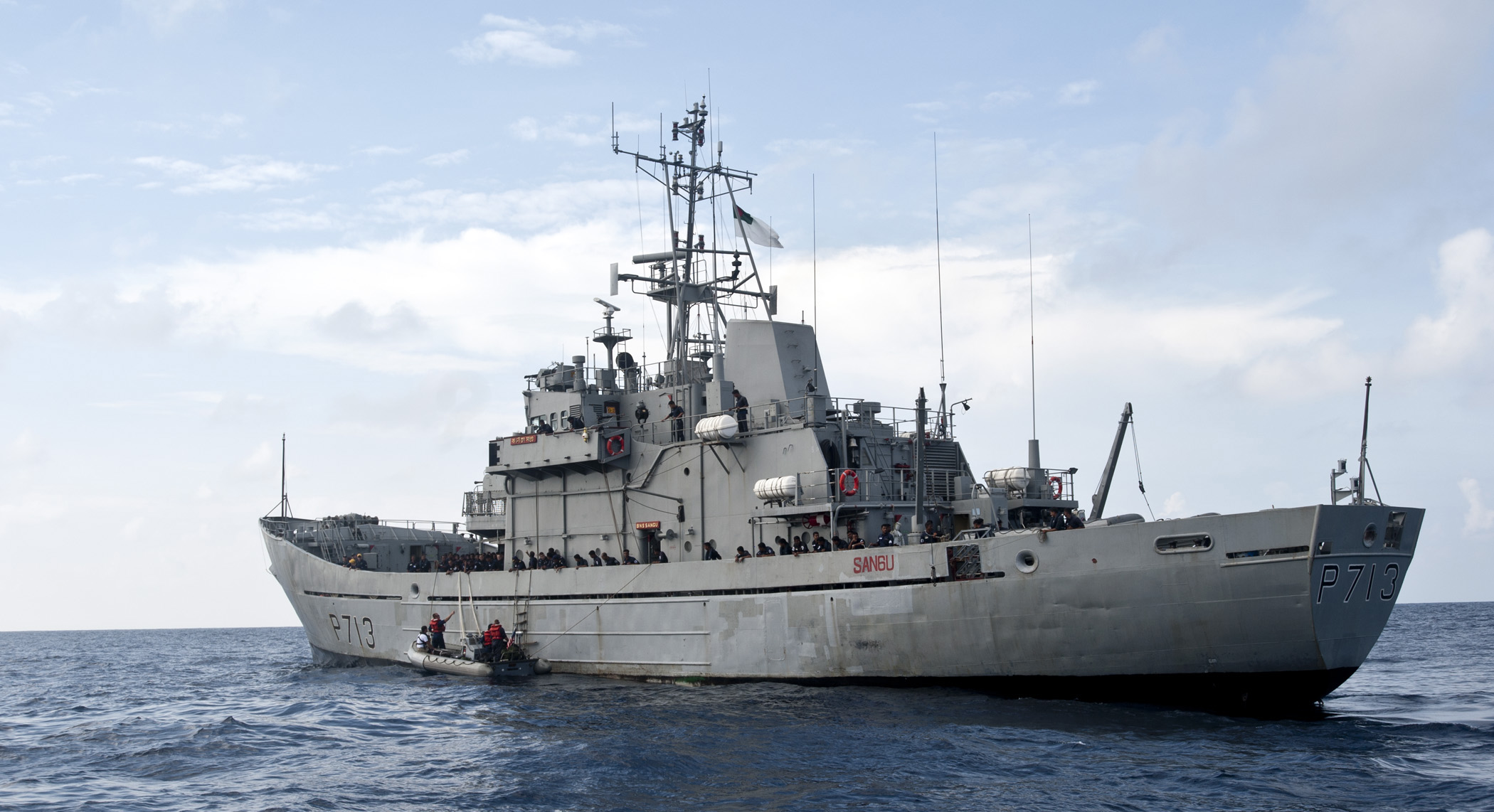
- Sister ship Sangu in September 2012

History

United Kingdom
- Name: HMS Jersey
- Namesake: Jersey, Channel Islands
- Builder: Hall, Russell & Company
- Yard number: 971
- Laid down: 1975
- Launched: 18 March 1976
- Sponsored by: Anne, Princess Royal
- Commissioned: January 1977
- Decommissioned: 1993
- Identification: Pennant number: P295
- Fate: Sold to Bangladesh, 1993

Bangladesh
- Name: BNS Shaheed Ruhul Amin
- Acquired: December 1993
- Commissioned: 29 January 1994
- Decommissioned: 16 June 2020
- In service: 1994–2020
- Identification: Pennant number: A511
- Nickname(s): BNS SR
- Status: Decommissioned

General characteristics
- Class & type: Island-class patrol vessel
- Displacement: 1,260 tons (full load)
- Length: 59.5 m (195 ft)
- Beam: 11 m (36 ft)
- Draught: 4.5 m (15 ft)
- Propulsion: 2 × Ruston 12RKC diesels; 5,640 hp (4,210 kW) sustained; 1 × shaft; cp prop
- Speed: 16.5 knots (30.6 km/h)
- Range: 7,000 nmi (13,000 km; 8,100 mi) at 12 knots (22 km/h; 14 mph)
- Complement: 39
- Sensors & processing systems: Surface Search and Navigation: Kelvin Hughes Type 1006 radar; I-band; Combat Data Systems: Racal CANE DEA-1 action data automation
- Armament: Guns: 1 × Bofors 40 mm/60 Mk 3; 2 × FN 7.62 mm machine guns; Countermeasures; ESM: Orange Crop; intercept

BNS Shaheed Ruhul Amin (A511) was an Island-class offshore patrol vessel of the Bangladesh Navy used as a training ship. She was built and served as a Royal Navy Island-class patrol vessel HMS Jersey (P295) from 1977 to 1993.

== History ==
=== British service ===
HMS Jersey was built at Aberdeen, being launched in 1976 by Princess Anne and subsequently commissioned into the Royal Navy later that year. She was the first ship of the class to be commissioned; six more followed her.

As part of the Fishery Protection Squadron, along with her sister ships, Jersey patrolled the waters around the UK providing protection for Britain's fishing grounds, as well as providing oil and gas platform protection. In 1993 she became involved in the Cherbourg incident, when Jersey captured the French trawler La Calypso in the Channel Islands waters on 2 April 1993.

She was decommissioned in 1993. All of the Island class were decommissioned by January 2004, being replaced by the modern River-class patrol vessels.

=== Bangladeshi service ===
Bangladesh purchased the ship as a training craft in 1993. She was commissioned in the Bangladesh Navy under the name Shaheed Ruhul Amin, in honour of naval hero Mohammad Ruhul Amin, on 29 January 1994. She was based at Chittagong. Ultimately, all but one of her sister ships were transferred to Bangladesh as patrol craft. On 16 June 2020, she was decommissioned from Bangladesh Navy.

== See also ==
- List of historic ships of the Bangladesh Navy

== Bibliography ==
- Richardson, Ian (February 2022). "Island Class Offshore Patrol Vessels (OPV)". Marine News Supplement: Warships. 76 (2): S118–S124. ISSN 0966-6958.
