= BNS Karotoa =

Island-class offshore patrol vessel

History

Bangladesh
- Name: Karotoa
- Namesake: Karatoya River
- Builder: Hall, Russell & Company, Aberdeen
- Yard number: 984
- Laid down: 11 June 1978
- Launched: 27 February 1979
- Acquired: 31 October 2002
- Commissioned: 4 May 2003
- Home port: Khulna
- Identification: Pennant number: P 913
- Status: in active service

General characteristics
- Class & type: Island-class offshore patrol vessel
- Displacement: 1,260 tons (full load)
- Length: 59.5 m (195 ft)
- Beam: 11 m (36 ft)
- Draught: 4.5 m (15 ft)
- Propulsion: 2 × Ruston 12RKC diesels; 5,640 hp (4,210 kW) sustained; 1 × shaft; cp prop
- Speed: 16.5 knots (30.6 km/h)
- Range: 7,000 nmi (13,000 km; 8,100 mi) at 12 kn (22 km/h; 14 mph)
- Complement: 39
- Sensors & processing systems: Surface Search and navigation: Kelvin Hughes Type 1006 radar; I-band; Combat Data Systems: Racal CANE DEA-1 action data automation
- Armament: Guns: 1 × Bofors 40 mm/60 Mk 3; 2 × FN 7.62 mm machine guns; Countermeasures; ESM: Orange Crop; intercept

BNS Karotoa is an Island-class offshore patrol vessel of the Bangladeshi Navy. She entered service with the Bangladeshi Navy in 2003.

== History ==
Built by Hall, Russell & Company, she was modelled on the ocean-going trawlers FPV Jura (1973) and FPV Westra (1974). The vessel was laid down on 11 June 1978 and launched on 27 February 1979. She was commissioned into Royal Navy as HMS Alderney (P278) on 6 October 1979. In 2002 she was sold to the Bangladesh Navy.

== Career ==
Bangladesh acquired the ship on 31 October 2002. On 4 May 2003, BNS Karotoa was commissioned into the Bangladesh Navy. She is currently serving under the command of the Commodore Commanding BN Khulna (COMKHUL).

== See also ==
- List of active ships of the Bangladesh Navy
- Image as HMS Alderney

== Bibliography ==
- Richardson, Ian (February 2022). "Island Class Offshore Patrol Vessels (OPV)". Marine News Supplement: Warships. 76 (2): S118–S124. ISSN 0966-6958.
