= Island-class patrol vessel =

1976 class of British patrol vessels

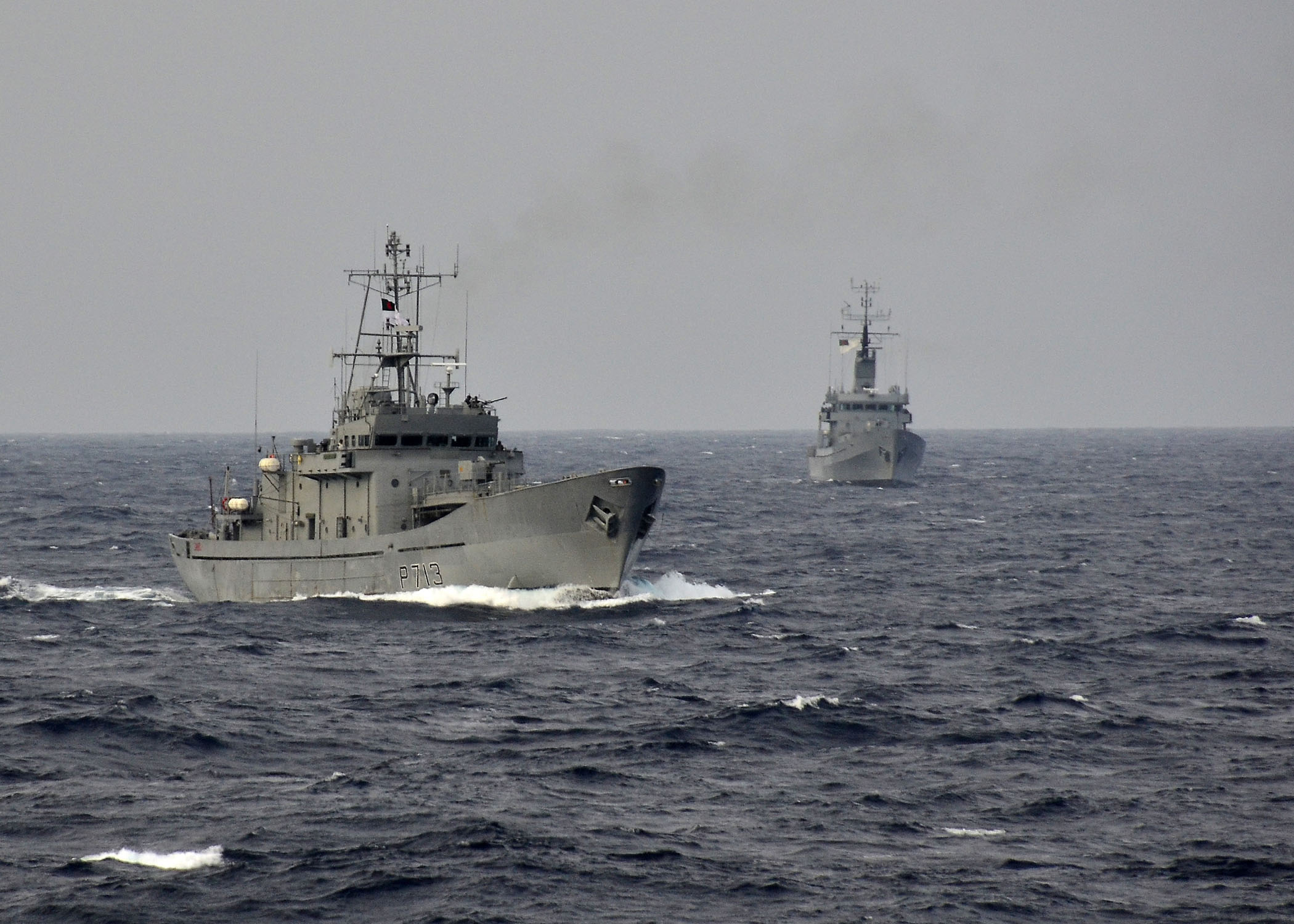
- BNS Sangu formerly HMS Guernsey operating in the Bay of Bengal, in 2011

Class overview
- Builders: Hall, Russell & Company
- Operators: Bangladesh Navy; Royal Navy (retired); Scottish Fisheries Protection Agency (retired); Trinidad and Tobago Coast Guard (retired); Sea Shepherd Conservation Society (retired)
- Succeeded by: Castle class
- In commission: 1976–Present
- Completed: 7 (excluding FPV JURA and FPV WESTRA)
- Active: 5 (Bangladesh Navy)
- Preserved: 1

General characteristics
- Type: Offshore patrol vessel
- Displacement: 1,000 tons (standard); 1,280 tons (full load)
- Length: 195 ft (59 m) (overall)
- Beam: 36 ft (11 m)
- Draft: 14 ft (4.3 m)
- Propulsion: 1 shaft, 2 Ruston-Paxman diesel, 4,380 hp (3,270 kW) variable-pitch propeller
- Speed: 16 knots (30 km/h)
- Range: 11,000 nautical miles (20,000 km) at 11 knots (20 km/h)
- Complement: 35
- Sensors & processing systems: Surface Search and navigation:Kelvin Hughes Type 1006 radar; Simrad RU sidescan sonar
- Armament: 1 × Bofors 40 mm L/60 Mark III gun, replaced by 1 × 30mm gun in some ships

The Island-class patrol vessel was first designed and built for the Scottish Fisheries Protection Agency. As a result of the Royal Navy's experiences in the Cod Wars with Iceland, FPV Jura (loaned to the Navy as HMS Jura) and FPV Westra were put in fishery protection patrols, the Navy built a further seven. These ships were designed and built by Hall Russell of Aberdeen, Scotland.

== Fishery protection cruisers ==
FPV Jura and FPV Westra were built by Hall, Russell & Company of Aberdeen in 1973 and 1975 respectively. Jura was loaned to the Royal Navy between 1975 and 1977 for evaluation.

== Royal Navy offshore fishery protection ships ==
The success of Jura encouraged the Royal Navy to build a further seven ships to the same design; these ships formed the bulk of the Fishery Protection Squadron, whose mission was to patrol the Atlantic fishing grounds, and ensure the security of the British oil and gas fields in the North Sea. However, since the mid-1990s, the class has been gradually decommissioned; Jersey was sold to the Bangladesh Navy in 1994, to be followed by Shetland, Alderney, Anglesey, Guernsey and Lindisfarne, with Orkney going to Trinidad and Tobago. The Island class was replaced in the Fishery Protection Squadron by the three ships of the River class.

== Ships in class ==
Name	Pennant number	Builder	Laid down	Launched	Commissioned	Status
Jura class OPVs (2)
FPV Jura	P296 (HMS Jura)	Hall, Russell & Company		1973		It was the design basis for the 7 Island class OPVs. Jura was sold in 1988 to Marrs of Hull and renamed Criscilla, and then sold to Marr Vessel Management Ltd renamed again as N'Madi. According to one source the ship was sold to Government of the Islamic Republic of Mauritania in 1992. She was broken up in Portugal in November 2001.
FPV Westra		Hall, Russell & Company		1974	1975	Sister ship of FPV Jura. Sold to Sea Shepherd Conservation Society and renamed MV Robert Hunter and then shortly after renamed MY Steve Irwin. Sold to charity Ship4Good in 2019 and actively sailing in 2026.
Island-class OPVs (7)
HMS Anglesey	P277	Hall, Russell & Company				Sold to the Bangladesh Navy and renamed BNS Gomati.
HMS Alderney	P278	Hall, Russell & Company				Sold to the Bangladesh Navy and renamed BNS Karotoa.
HMS Jersey	P295	Hall, Russell & Company				Sold to the Bangladesh Navy and renamed BNS Shaheed Ruhul Amin.
HMS Guernsey	P297	Hall, Russell & Company				Sold to the Bangladesh Navy and renamed BNS Sangu.
HMS Shetland	P298	Hall, Russell & Company				Sold to the Bangladesh Navy and renamed BNS Kapotaksha.
HMS Orkney	P299	Hall, Russell & Company				Sold to Trinidad and Tobago Coast Guard and renamed TTS Nelson. Sold for scrap 2016.
HMS Lindisfarne	P300	Hall, Russell & Company				Sold to the Bangladesh Navy and renamed BNS Turag.

== Disposal ==
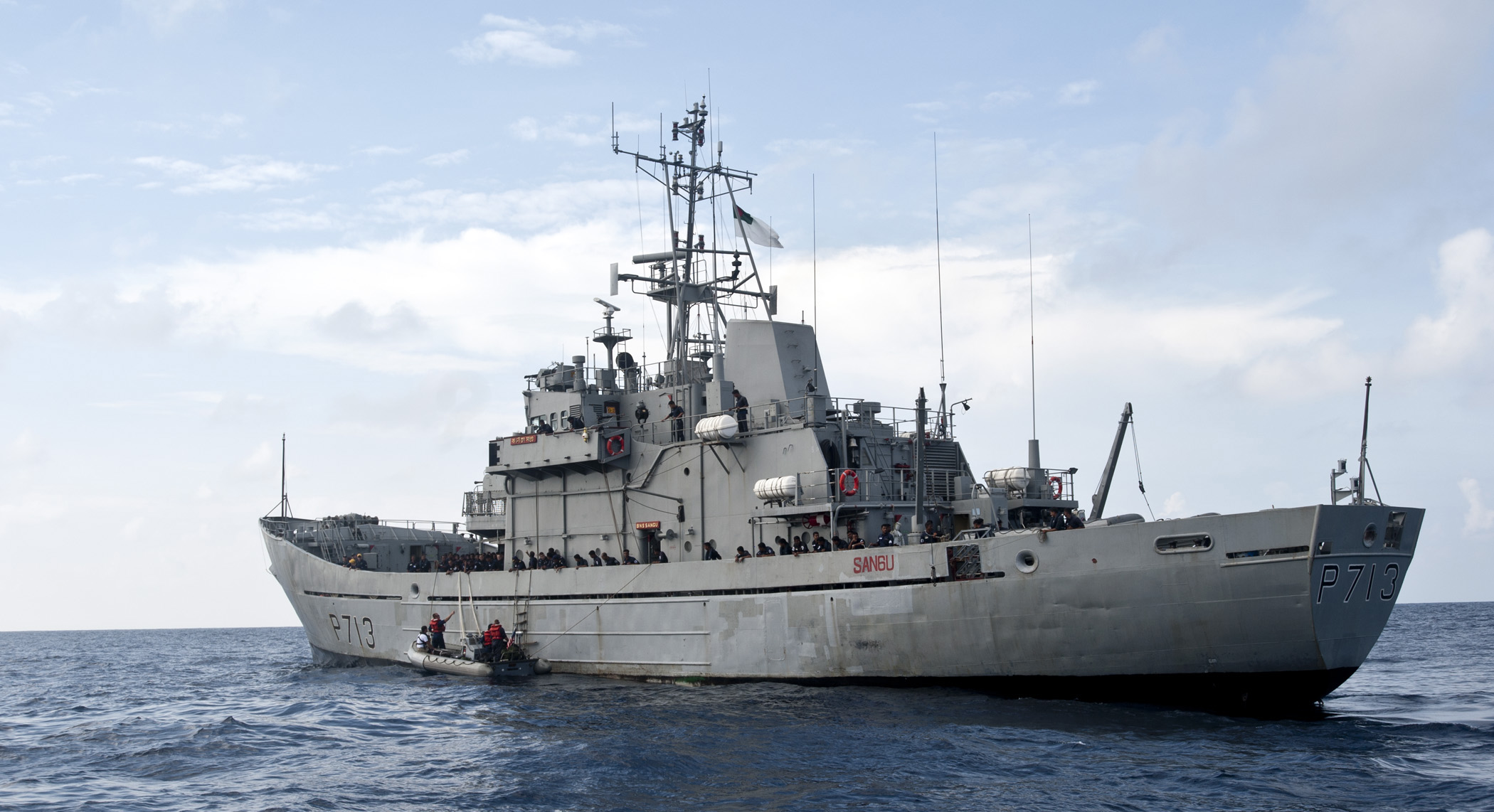
BNS Sangu in the Bay of Bengal

Currently, five Island-class patrol vessels are in active service with the Bangladesh Navy. They are Karotoa (ex-Alderney), Kapatakhaya (ex-Shetland), Turag (ex-Lindisfarne), Gomati (ex-Anglesey) and Sangu (ex-Guernsey). Another ex-Royal Navy Island-class vessel, Jersey, was used as the training ship, Shaheed Ruhul Amin. The final ship of the class, ex-Royal Navy vessel Orkney was in service with the Trinidad and Tobago Coast Guard and named TTS Nelson. She was sold for scrap 2016.

The Scottish Fisheries Protection Agency Westra was sold to the Sea Shepherd Conservation Society in 2006 and renamed MY Steve Irwin. Jura was sold in 1988 and renamed Criscilla, and then N'Madi. She was broken up in Portugal in November 2001.
