= Golden Guernsey =

Channel Island breed of goat

Royal Golden Guernsey
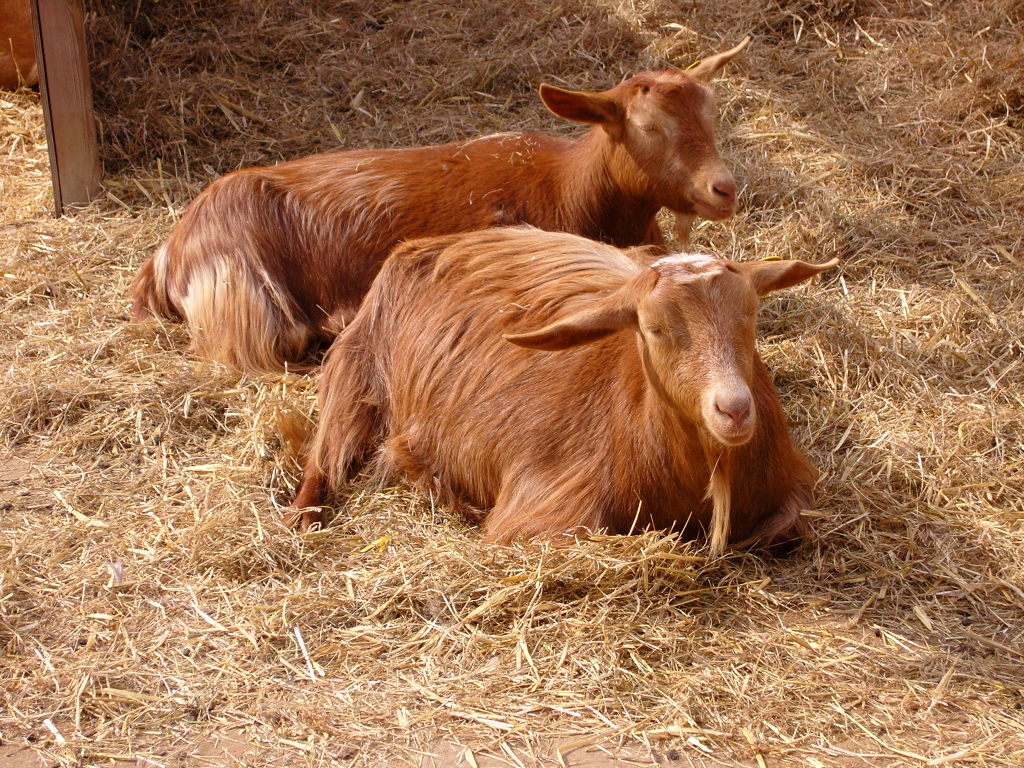
- Conservation status: FAO (2007): endangered-maintained; DAD-IS (2019): at risk; RBST (2020): minority
- Country of origin: Channel Islands
- Distribution: Channel Islands; United Kingdom
- Use: goat's milk

Traits
- Skin colour: golden
- Horn status: usually polled (hornless)
- Tassels: no
- Goat; Capra aegagrus hircus

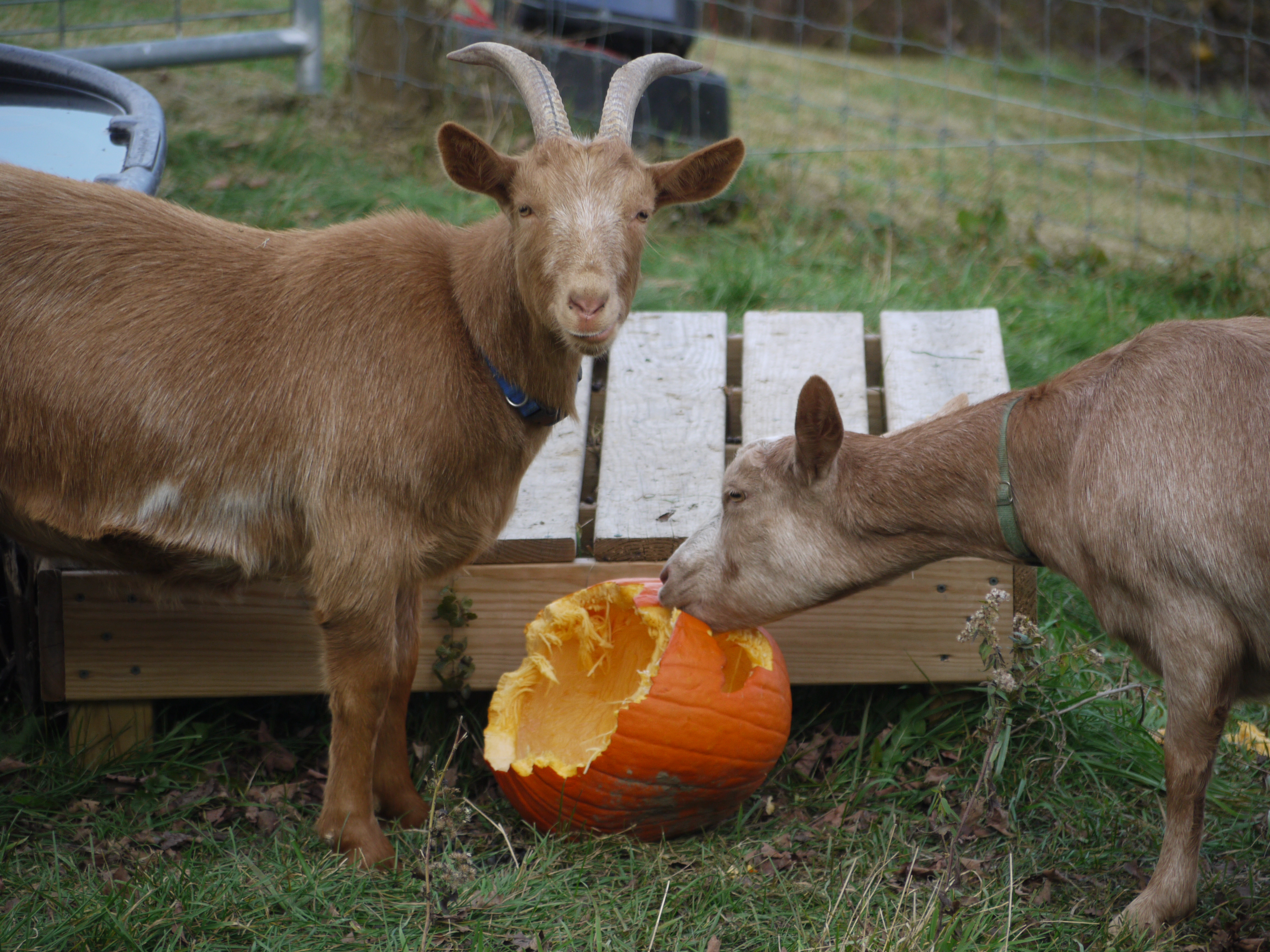
Golden Guernseys eating a pumpkin

The Golden Guernsey is a rare breed of dairy goat from Guernsey in the Channel Islands, where it has been known for more than two hundred years. In 2024 it received a Royal title from King Charles III and is officially the Royal Golden Guernsey Goat.

It is an endangered breed, with fewer than 2000 living animals.

== History ==
Golden-coloured goats have been known in Guernsey for some two hundred years; the first documented reference is in a guide book published in 1826. In the nineteenth century these goats were known as "Golden Gessenay", Gessenay being the French name for the Swiss Saanen breed.

Much of the development of the breed is attributed to Miriam Milbourne, who started a herd at L'Ancresse in 1937 and was able to maintain it through the German occupation of the Channel Islands during the Second World War. From 1922 the goats were registered in the general herd-book of the Guernsey Goat Society; a separate register in the herd-book was created for them in 1965.

From 1967 a small number were exported to England, where they were cross-bred with British goats to form the British Guernsey.

The Golden Guernsey is an endangered breed: it was listed by the FAO as "endangered-maintained" in 2007. In 2019 the population numbers reported to DAD-IS were 1381 for the Golden Guernsey and 171 for the British Guernsey; both were listed as "at risk". In 2020 the Golden Guernsey was listed as "minority" on the goat watchlist of the Rare Breeds Survival Trust.

On 16 July 2024, the breed was granted a Royal title by King Charles III, becoming formally known as the 'Royal Golden Guernsey Goat'.

== Characteristics ==
As its name suggests, the goat is golden in colour, with hues ranging from pale blond to deep bronze. They are smaller and more fine-boned than other British milking goats, and there is great variety in coat length. The males are usually horned, with very splendid horns, very few do not have horns. The goats are easy to handle.

At the time of their elevation to a royal title, Christopher Price, the chief executive of the Rare Breeds Survival Trust, noted that the goat breed contributes to environmental benefits because they are fussy eaters while they graze.
