= BNS Sangu =

Patrol Vessel of the Bangladesh Navy

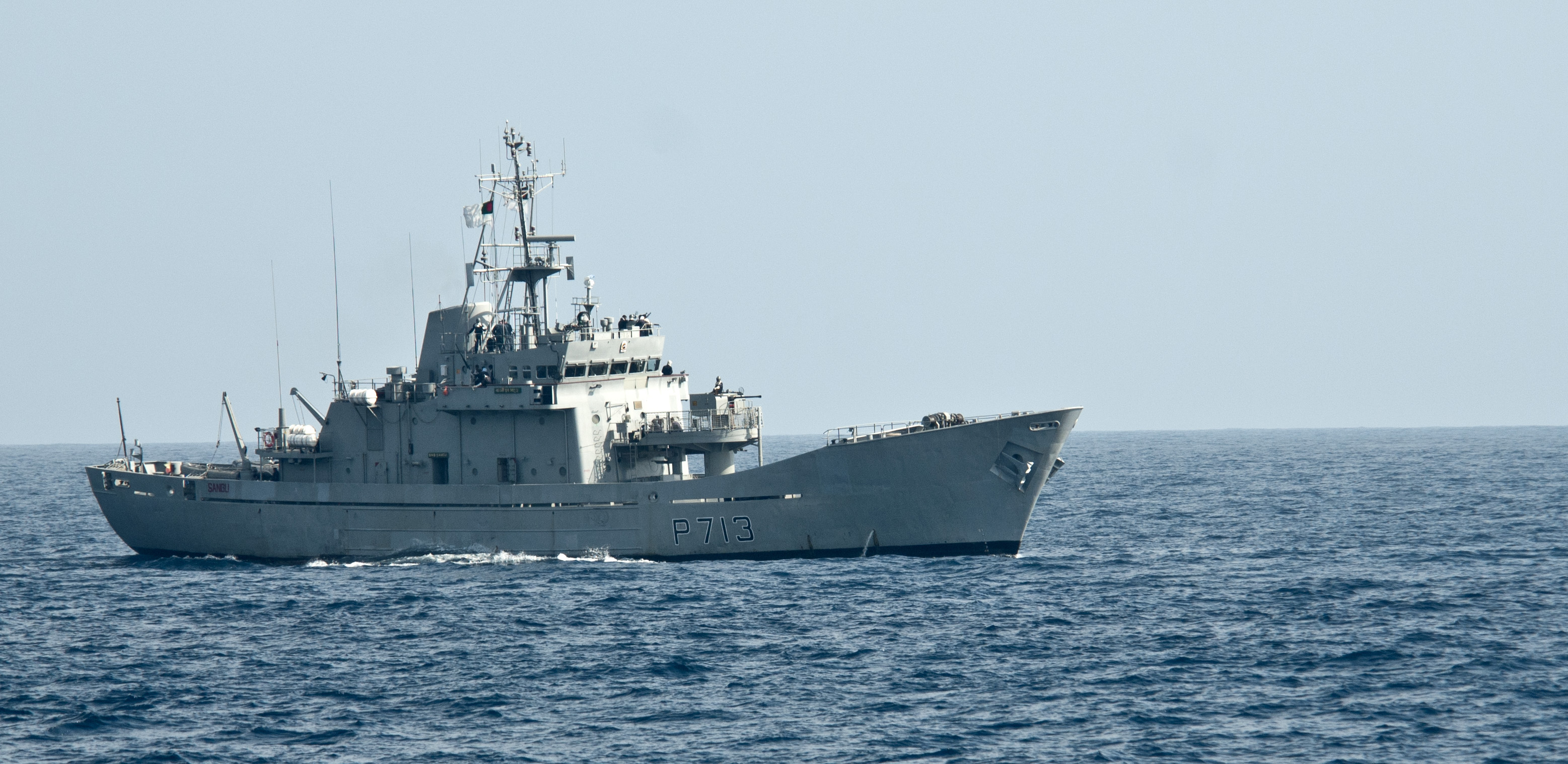
- BNS Sangu operating in the Bay of Bengal

History

Bangladesh
- Name: Sangu
- Namesake: Sangu River
- Builder: Hall, Russell & Company, Aberdeen
- Yard number: 974
- Laid down: 14 May 1976
- Launched: 17 February 1977
- Acquired: 2004
- Commissioned: 3 October 2004
- Home port: Chittagong
- Identification: Pennant number: P 713
- Status: in active service

General characteristics
- Class & type: Island-class offshore patrol vessel
- Displacement: 1,260 tons (full load)
- Length: 59.5 m (195 ft)
- Beam: 11 m (36 ft)
- Draught: 4.5 m (15 ft)
- Propulsion: 2 × Ruston 12RKC diesels; 5,640 hp (4,210 kW) sustained; 1 × shaft; cp prop
- Speed: 16.5 knots (30.6 km/h)
- Range: 7,000 nautical miles (13,000 km; 8,100 mi) at 12 knots (22 km/h; 14 mph)
- Complement: 39
- Sensors & processing systems: Surface Search and Navigation: Kelvin Hughes Type 1006 radar; I-band; Combat Data Systems: Racal CANE DEA-1 action data automation
- Armament: Guns: 1 × Bofors 40 mm/60 cal. Mk 3; 2 × FN 7.62 mm machine gus; Countermeasures; ESM: Orange Crop; intercept

BNS Sangu is an Island-class offshore patrol vessel of the Bangladesh Navy. She began serving the Bangladesh Navy in 2004.

== History ==
Built by Hall, Russell & Company, she was modelled on the ocean-going trawlers FPV Jura (1973) and FPV Westra (1974). She was launched on 17 February 1977. She was commissioned into the Royal Navy as HMS Guernsey (P297) on 28 October 1977. On 29 January 2004 she was sold to the Bangladesh Navy.

== Career ==
BNS Sangu reached Mongla Naval Base in May 2004 after an 8,000 mile journey from the United Kingdom. The ship made brief stopovers at Tangier port, Morocco, Port Said, Egypt, Jeddah, Saudi Arabia, the Port of Salalah, Oman and the Port of Colombo in Sri Lanka as goodwill visits as well as to replenish rations, fuel and provisions. The ship was commissioned on 3 October 2004 under the command of the Commodore Commanding Khulna (COMKHUL), but was later commanded by Commodore Commanding BN Flotilla (COMBAN). About 100 personnel serve on board her.

BNS Sangu participated in the CARAT exercise with the US Navy in the Bay of Bengal in September 2011. The ship also participated in CARAT 2012 a year later.

BNS Sangu participated in Exercise Milan, a biennial multilateral exercise at Andaman Islands in India in 2008 and 2014.

== Gallery ==
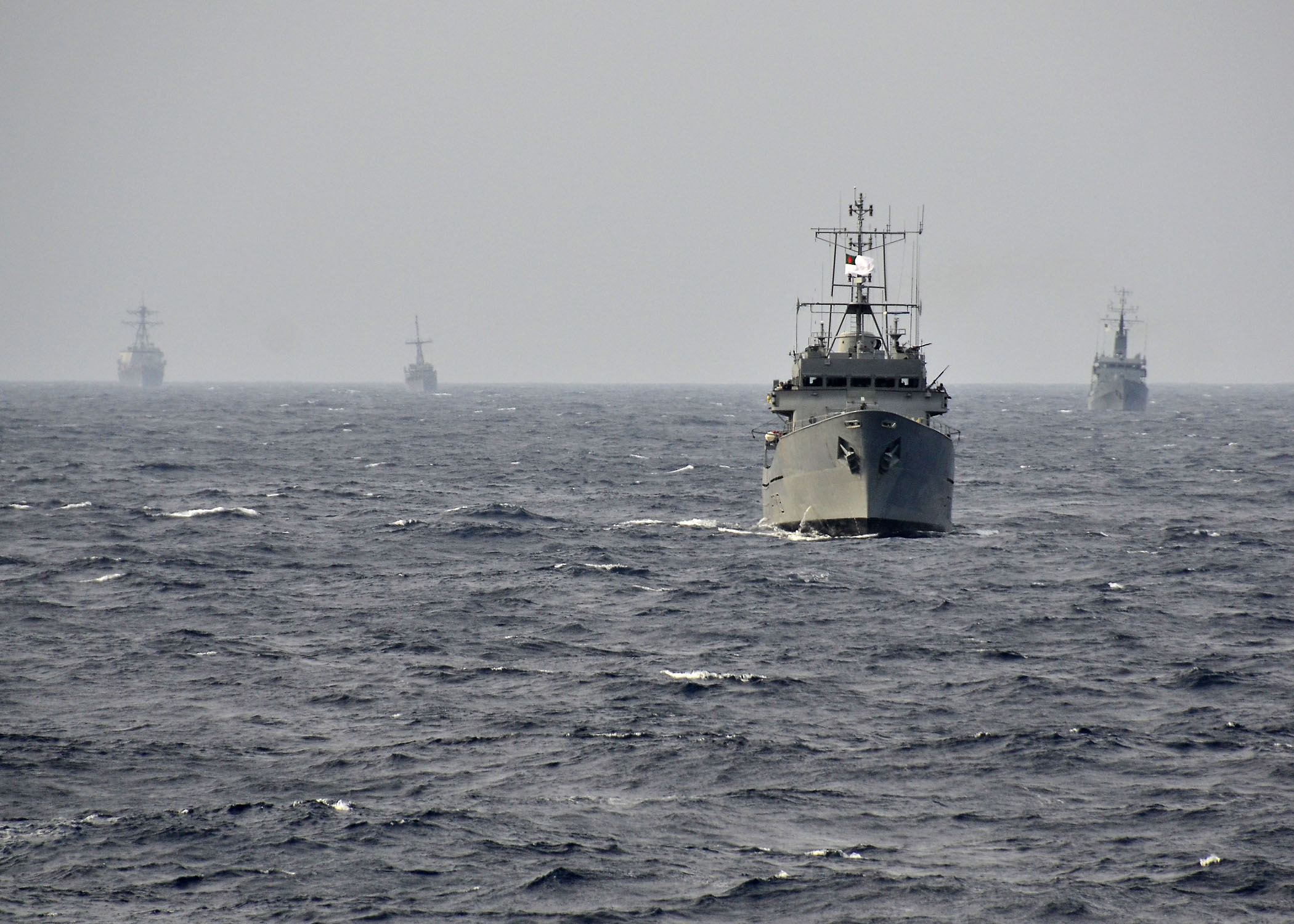
BNS Sangu with other ships behind

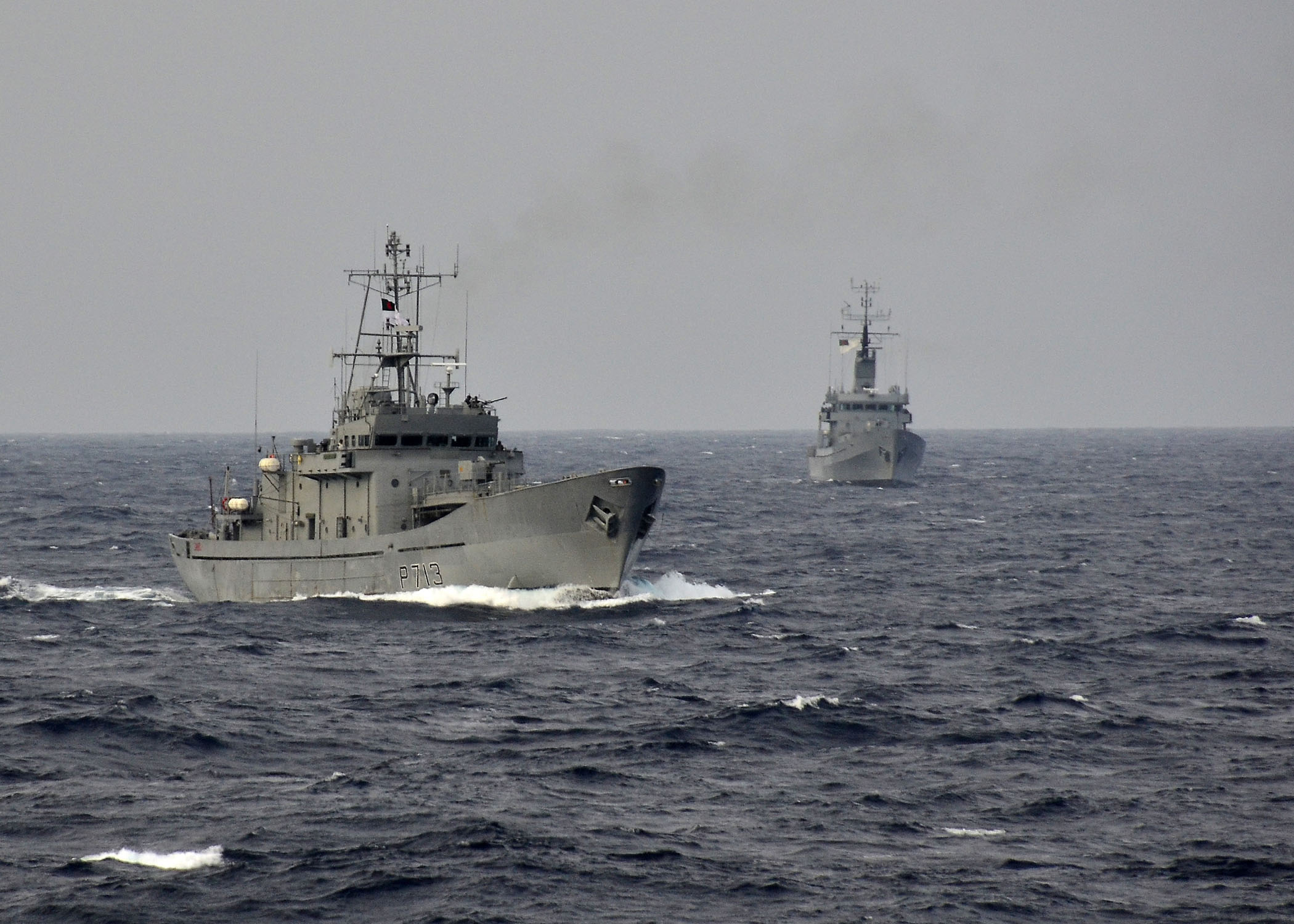
BNS Sangu in Bay of Bengal during CARAT exercise.

== See also ==
- List of active ships of the Bangladesh Navy

== Bibliography ==
- Preston, Antony (1995). "United Kingdom". In Chumbley, Stephen (ed.). Conway's All the World's Fighting Ships 1947-1995. Annapolis, Maryland: Naval Institute Press. pp. 479–543. ISBN 1-55750-132-7.
- Richardson, Ian (February 2022). "Island Class Offshore Patrol Vessels (OPV)". Marine News Supplement: Warships. 76 (2): S118–S124. ISSN 0966-6958.
