= MY Steve Irwin =

Vessel used formerly by the Sea Shepherd Conservation Society

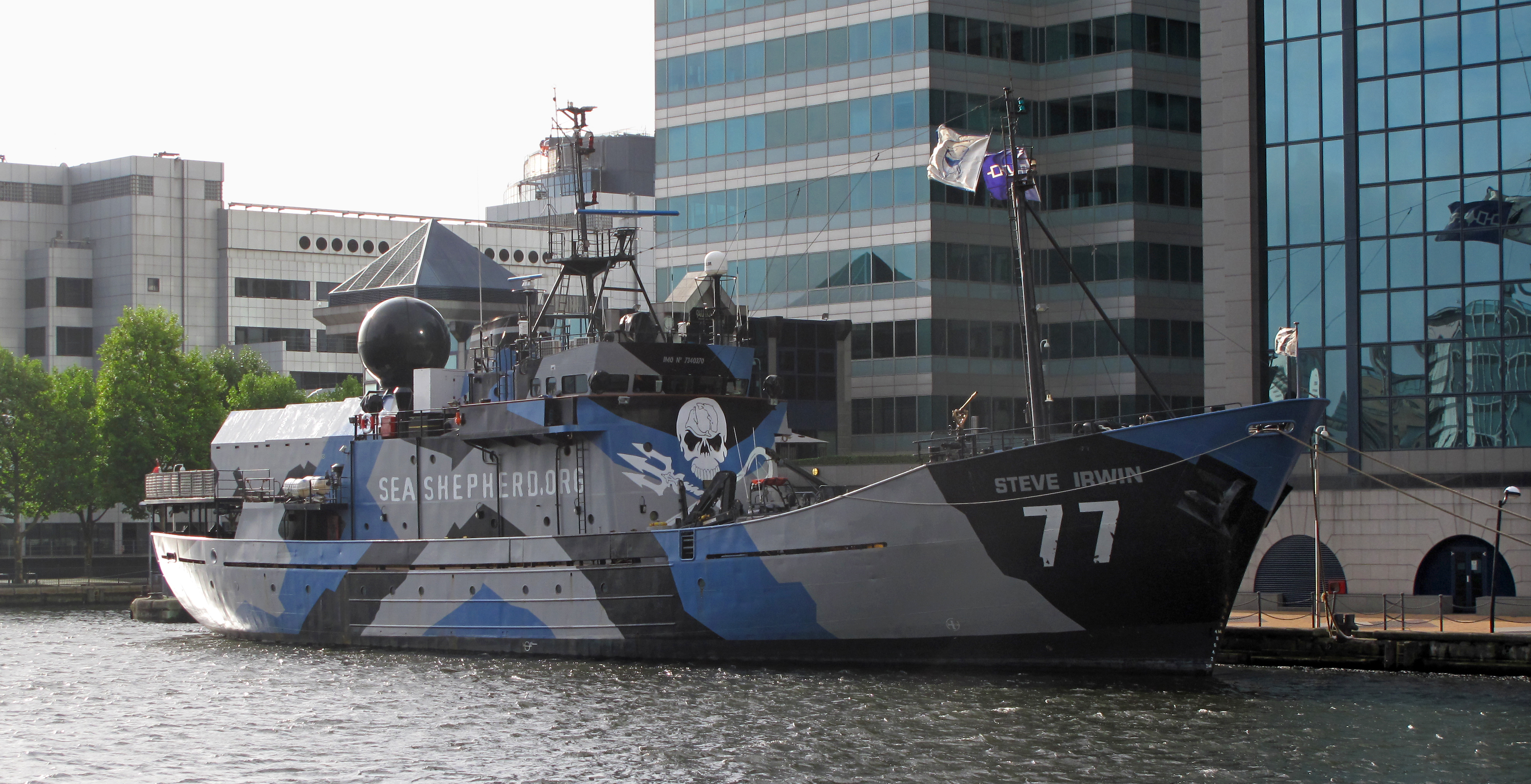
- MY Steve Irwin moored in the West India Docks, London, 2011

History

Scotland
- Name: 1975–2006:Westra
- Owner: 1975–1999: Secretary of State for Scotland
- Operator: 1975–2003: Scottish Fisheries Protection Agency
- Ordered: 1974
- Builder: Hall, Russell & Company, Aberdeen, Scotland
- Yard number: 962
- Christened: Westra
- In service: 1975–2003
- Out of service: 2003–2006 (laid up for disposal)
- Home port: Leith, Scotland

Netherlands
- Name: 2006–2007: MV Robert Hunter; 2007–Present: MY Steve Irwin
- Namesake: Steve Irwin
- Owner: 2006–2019: Sea Shepherd Conservation Society; 2019–Present: Ship4Good
- Operator: 2006–2019: Sea Shepherd Conservation Society; 2019–Present: Ship4Good
- Port of registry: Rotterdam, Netherlands
- In service: 2006-2019; 2026-Present
- Out of service: 2019-2025 (inactive)
- Home port: Hobart, Tasmania
- Identification: Call sign: PC9093; IMO number: 7340370; MMSI number: 244943000
- Status: Actively sailing

General characteristics
- Class & type: Island-class patrol vessel
- Tonnage: 85 GT
- Length: 59.43 m (195 ft 0 in)
- Beam: 10.97 m (36 ft 0 in)
- Draught: 4.26 m (14 ft 0 in)
- Propulsion: 2 x British Polar Engines 12-cylinder 2,100 bhp (1,600 kW), driving a variable-pitch propeller
- Speed: 12.5–16.5 knots (23–31 km/h)
- Capacity: 200 tons fuel
- Crew: 43
- Aircraft carried: 1 MD Helicopters MD 500 can be embarked

MY Steve Irwin is a 59-metre (194 ft) motor vessel that previously was the flagship of the Sea Shepherd Conservation Society and was used in their direct action campaigns against whaling and against illegal fisheries activities. The vessel was built in 1975 and formerly served as a Scottish Fisheries Protection Agency conservation enforcement patrol boat, the FPV Westra, for 28 years.

Sea Shepherd had originally christened the vessel the MV Robert Hunter after Canadian Robert Hunter, co-founder of Greenpeace, but it was renamed in honor of The Crocodile Hunter star Steve Irwin, who had died just over a year earlier, on September 4, 2006. Irwin had considered joining the vessel on a voyage to Antarctica shortly before his death, and the renaming was endorsed by his widow Terri.

The ship and her crew, and their efforts for conservation, were the subject of the Animal Planet show Whale Wars.

The MV Steve Irwin is now in the ownership of the not for profit Ship4Good. In late 2024, Ship4Good announced a new long-term partnership with marine debris prevention charity Tangaroa Blue Foundation. In 2025, the MV Steve Irwin came out of retirement for a new mission to remove and prevent marine debris across Australia and regions.

== Registration ==
In January 2007, the ship was struck from the British Ship Register after a Japanese request. The ship has been registered in the Netherlands as of October 8, 2007.

== Career ==
The FPV Westra was laid up ready for disposal in 2003 when Sea Shepherd purchased her in November 2006 and renamed her Robert Hunter.

=== 2007 ===
In February 2007, Robert Hunter joined Farley Mowat in order to prevent the Japanese whaling vessel Nisshin Maru from hunting in an action Sea Shepherd called Operation Leviathan. Sea Shepherd members threw bottles of foul-smelling butyric acid onto the decks of the Nisshin Maru. The Japanese say three members of the whaler were injured in the attack. Robert Hunter and Farley Mowat obstructed the path of the whaling ship, and Robert Hunter and Kaiko Maru collided with each other. One Japanese official accused the Sea Shepherd organisation of behaving "like pirates". Robert Hunter sustained a 3-foot gash in the hull above the waterline at the stern of the ship.

Steve Irwin has also participated in "Operation Migaloo" (named after Migaloo, the albino humpback whale) that started in November 2007, and after repairs were completed in Launceston and a brief stop over in Melbourne, she was scheduled to depart for the Antarctic on December 1, 2007.

=== 2008 ===
On January 15, 2008, after throwing packages of butyric acid onto the decks and attempting to entangle a hunting ship's propeller, two Sea Shepherd members boarded the Japanese whaling vessel Yūshin Maru No. 2. Paul Watson stated that it was his intention to create an international incident through the boarding and expected detainment. They later stated that their intent had been to present a protest note to its captain. Benjamin Potts, a 28-year-old cook from Sydney, Australia, and Giles Lane, a 35-year-old engineer from Leeds, United Kingdom, were detained by crew of Yūshin Maru No. 2.

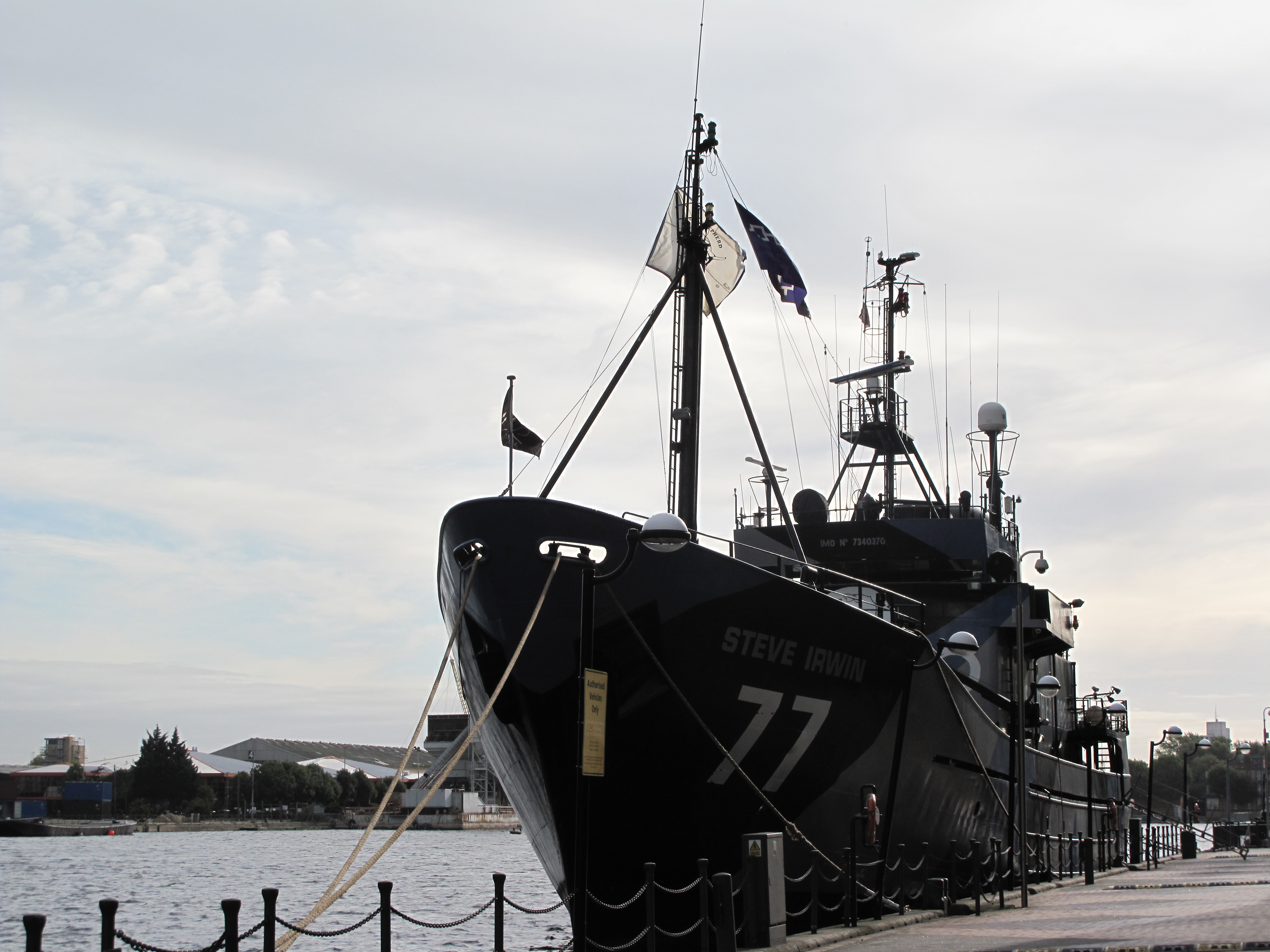
Steve Irwin in London Docklands, UK 2011

Sea Shepherd claimed that the two had been kidnapped and tied to the radar mast for several hours with ropes and zip ties. Potts and Lane, however, later stated that they were tied for only fifteen minutes to the side of the ship and a couple of minutes to the radio mast before being taken below deck. Glenn Inwood, a spokesperson for the whalers from the Institute of Cetacean Research (ICR), said that the activists were being held in an unlocked office, but were being guarded. In another statement, they stated that the action of boarding their vehicle was illegal and that the men were being held pending decisions on their future.

On January 16 the ICR issued a statement claiming that the protesters had thrown canisters of acid on board the ship and attempted to damage property. They also denied claims that the men had been assaulted and tied to the ship's mast. Hideki Moronuki further stated that "The ICR (Institute of Cetacean Research) is ready to release the two Conservationists provided that full security can be secured for our research vessel. Sea Shepherd is a very violent organisation." In a letter faxed to Steve Irwin, the ICR stated that part of the handover conditions include that Sea Shepherd "must not take any violent action or video/photo shooting activities against us." The acid in question was, according to Sea Shepherd, butyric acid, which was used not to damage the ship itself but to render the work-deck unusable due to its foul and long-lasting smell.

On January 17, the Australian customs ship MV Oceanic Viking started preparation to transfer the two men held on the whaling vessel. On the morning of January 18, the two men were safely transferred to the MV Oceanic Viking. After an investigation by the Australian Federal Police, no criminal action was taken against the conservationists.

Both sides accused the other of terrorism during the incident. The ICR called the butyric acid attack on Yūshin Maru No. 2 an "inhumane terrorist attack" and called on the Australian Government to seize the Steve Irwin. Conversely, Steve Irwin 1st Officer Peter Brown stated that "the Institute of Cetacean Research is acting like a terrorist organisation [...] Here they are taking hostages and making demands. Our policy is that we don't respond to terrorist demands."

Following the March 3 clashes between Sea Shepherd members aboard Steve Irwin and Japanese whalers, the Dutch government announced that it was investigating the incident as the vessel sails under the Dutch flag.

=== 2009 ===
On February 6, Steve Irwin collided with the vessel Yūshin Maru No. 2 (Japanese: 第2勇新丸) and later with the vessel Yūshin Maru No. 3 (Japanese: 第3勇新丸) while they were whaling in the Southern Ocean. The Japanese-based Institute of Cetacean Research claimed that MY Steve Irwin deliberately turned into the stern side of the vessel Yūshin Maru No. 3 to ram her. Video footage of the incident was later released by the institute showing the incident. Steve Irwin's operator Paul Watson denied the ramming, saying "They weren't rammed, two vessels collided—the Yushin Maru 3 and the Steve Irwin when they shot in front of us to transfer whale."

For the next year, the ship was drydocked in Brisbane while repairs to the hull and other alterations could be made. Included in these renovations was the installation of Steve Irwin's own water cannon for use in campaigns. After three days, a suspected Japanese-chartered aircraft located the Steve Irwin en route to the Southern Ocean and instructed the MV Shōnan Maru 2 to observe the movements of the vessel. Heavy swells barred the Delta from reaching the vessel, and, upon arrival, a Japanese LRAD was used against the helicopter which forced it to stand down. For the next two weeks, Shōnan Maru 2 continued to observe Steve Irwin, despite continued attempts by the ship to lose the tail. Ultimately, Steve Irwin returned to Australia, where Shōnan Maru was unable to track her due to a heavy storm, in addition to legal complications.

=== 2010 ===
In January 2010, the ship continued to hunt for the Japanese fleet. After the loss of MY Ady Gil in a collision with Shonan Maru No.2, Steve Irwin met up with MY Bob Barker, with which she exchanged fuel, supplies, and crew. The ship then returned to Fremantle to restock, departing on January 30. In the meantime, Bob Barker had located the factory ship, Nisshin Maru, and was tailing the ship. On February 8, Steve Irwin joined Bob Barker in pursuit of Nisshin Maru. Once the two Sea Shepherd vessels had linked up, Steve Irwin took up position behind Nisshin Maru to obstruct the factory ships slipway and engaged her with water cannon. On February 15, Pete Bethune departed from Steve Irwin on a jet ski, boarding Shōnan Maru 2. He was subsequently detained and later arrested by the Japan Coast Guard for trespassing. The two ships remained behind the whaler until Steve Irwin was forced to return to Australia on February 18, arriving in Hobart on March 6.

=== 2011 ===
In late February 2011, during Operation No Compromise, Steve Irwin was contacted by the Royal New Zealand Navy to take part in the search for Berserk, a polar exploration vessel owned by renowned explorer Jarle Andhøy, which had activated her emergency transponder near McMurdo Sound during a storm. The search was eventually called off after Steve Irwin found an empty life raft, which was later confirmed to have been from Berserk. The three people on board are presumed dead.

Steve Irwin began patrolling the territorial waters of Libya in June 2011 in an effort to spot unauthorised bluefin tuna fishing boats and cut their fishing nets. She was met with attempts by some fishermen to incapacitate it, to which it responded with water hoses and stink bombs. On July 15, 2011 the ship was held by the British Government due to a pending lawsuit by a Maltese fishing company. The ship was released on August 2, 2011 after a bond of £520,000 was posted. As of September 2011, the ship was docked in the South Quay of West India Dock, London.

In December, Steve Irwin joined Bob Barker and Brigitte Bardot in locating and pursuing the Japanese whaling fleet, which had passed by off the western Australian coast, on the way to the Southern Ocean for whaling operations. A drone surveillance aircraft launched from Steve Irwin located the whaling fleet some 500 miles off the southwest coast of Australia on December 24. After chasing the fleet for four days, Steve Irwin had to break off and escort Brigitte Bardot back to Fremantle, after Brigitte Bardot was damaged by a rogue wave.

=== 2012 ===
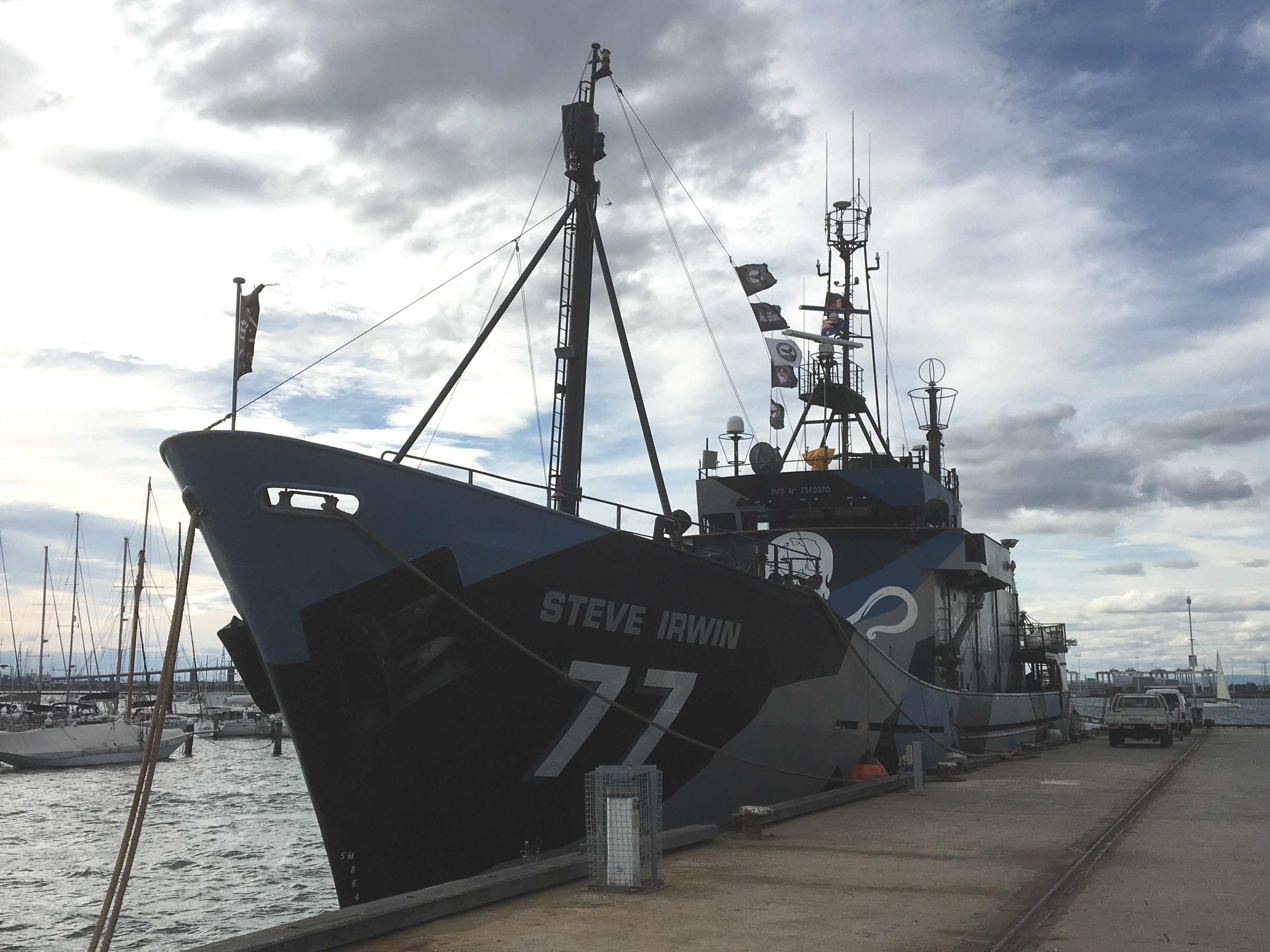
Sea Shepherd's Steve Irwin at Williamstown, Australia, August 2016

On January 5 Steve Irwin arrived in Fremantle Harbour escorting the severely damaged Brigitte Bardot from the Southern Ocean, monitored by the Japanese whaling ship Shōnan Maru 2. While in port, Steve Irwin defied an order by the Fremantle harbourmaster to lower her Jolly Roger-styled flag after docking in Fremantle. After departing the port, a team from environmentalist group "Forest Rescue Australia" approached and illegally boarded the security ship Shōnan Maru 2, climbing over spikes and razor wire in international waters off the coast of Bunbury, Western Australia with the assistance of small boat crews from the Steve Irwin. While Japan agreed to release the activists, the Australian Prime Minister Julia Gillard slammed the action as "unacceptable" and warned that others who carry out similar protests would be "charged and convicted".

=== 2013 ===
On February 20, Sea Shepherd Conservation Society founder Paul Watson claimed the Japanese whaling ship Nisshin Maru rammed Steve Irwin, MY Sam Simon and Bob Barker multiple times in a confrontation in the Southern Ocean, north of Australia's Casey Research Station in Antarctica.

=== 2018 ===
On December 2, 2018, Sea Shepherd announced that the ship will be retired, stripped and recycled in China, and the MY Ocean Warrior will be taking its spot as the flagship vessel of the fleet.

=== 2019 ===
Following news of the ship's possible scrapping, the ship was saved by Kerrie Goodall, founder of the Ship4Good Philanthropic Organization, successfully leading the "Save the Steve" campaign. The Steve Irwin was moored in Williamstown, Victoria, with possible uses and future location of the ship being discussed. The 'Steve' is recognised as a historic ship by the Australian Maritime Museum. At the time there was a basic Sea Shepherd Museum, bar, cafe, ship tours, weekend and monthly events.

=== 2022 ===
The vessel was in Newcastle Harbour for repairs and planned to eventually head north to Brisbane.

=== 2024 ===
The main engines of the Steve Irwin were restarted for the first time in 5 years. And a team began working on the vessel to get her back to sea, to work in another activist role towards ocean and wildlife conservation.

=== 2026 ===
MY Steve Irwin left Newcastle Harbour (Australia) bound for Melbourne in April 2026. The ship will operate from Melbourne to work on collaborative marine campaigns along Australia's east coast for up to two months annually.

The ship has been berthed in Docklands, Melbourne since at least early 2026.

== See also ==
- Neptune's Navy, a list of vessels operated by Sea Shepherd
