= Hall, Russell & Company =

Shipbuilders and iron founders in Aberdeen, Scotland

- Type: Private
- Industry: Shipbuilding
- Founded: 1864
- Defunct: 1992
- Fate: Closed
- Headquarters: Aberdeen, Scotland, UK

Hall, Russell & Company, Limited was a shipbuilder based in Aberdeen, Scotland.

== History ==
Brothers James and William Hall, Thomas Russell, a Glasgow engineer, and James Cardno Couper founded the company in 1864 to build steam engines and boilers. In 1866 the company built its first iron steamship, the Douglas, for the Hong Kong shipowner Douglas Lapraik. Like most shipyards of their era, Hall Russell built ships first using iron and later changing to steel.

In the Second World War Hall Russell built a number of Royal Navy Flower-class corvettes and River-class frigates. In 1944–45 Hall, Russell built five coasters under sub-contract for the Burntisland Shipbuilding Company of Fife: hull numbers 773, 776, 781, 785 and 788. After the war the company built fishing vessels, cargo ships and naval patrol craft. In 1956–57 Hall, Russell built two more coasters for Burntisland: hull 750 launched as SS Winga and hull 857 launched as William Cory & Son's MV Corsea.

In 1977 the company became part of the nationalised British Shipbuilders Corporation. £2 million was invested to construct a covered shipbuilding hall over the two largest building berths. Equipped with two overhead travelling cranes, it was able to accommodate the construction of ships of up to 8,000 tonnes. At 121 metres in length, 46 metres wide and 30 metres high it was the largest single storey building in Aberdeen and was completed in 1982. Hall Russell was returned to the private sector in 1986 as part of the dismantling of the British Shipbuilders group. Having been placed in receivership in 1988, it came under the ownership of A&P Appledore International in 1989, as A&P Appledore International (Aberdeen).

HMS Starling (P241) fitting out adjacent to the shipbuilding hall, 1984.

The last vessel completed at the yard was the RMS St Helena, launched in 1989 and delivered in 1990. The shipyard had been classed by the Government as a naval shipbuilder, despite traditionally producing fishing vessels and small cargo ships, and closed in 1992, with the covered shipbuilding hall and other buildings demolished in the same year. The shipyard's dry dock is now used by Dale's Marine Services for ship repair work.

=== Notable ships built ===
The most widely known ship built by Hall Russell was MV Sir William Hardy. Launched in 1955, she was the first diesel-electric all-refrigerated trawler built in the UK. Refurbished by Greenpeace, she was renamed on 29 April 1978 the Rainbow Warrior. She was bombed by French agents in New Zealand 10 July 1985. Her masts currently stand outside the Dargaville Museum in the upper North Island, New Zealand.

They were builder of Island-class OPV. The class is still in active service with Bangladesh Navy. MY Steve Irwin was the flagship of the Sea Shepherd Conservation Society, and was used in their direct action campaigns against whaling and against illegal fisheries activities.

They were also builder of Castle-class OPV. The ships of the class are now in active service with Bangladesh Navy. These are now reclassified as corvettes by the Bangladesh Navy.

== Gallery ==
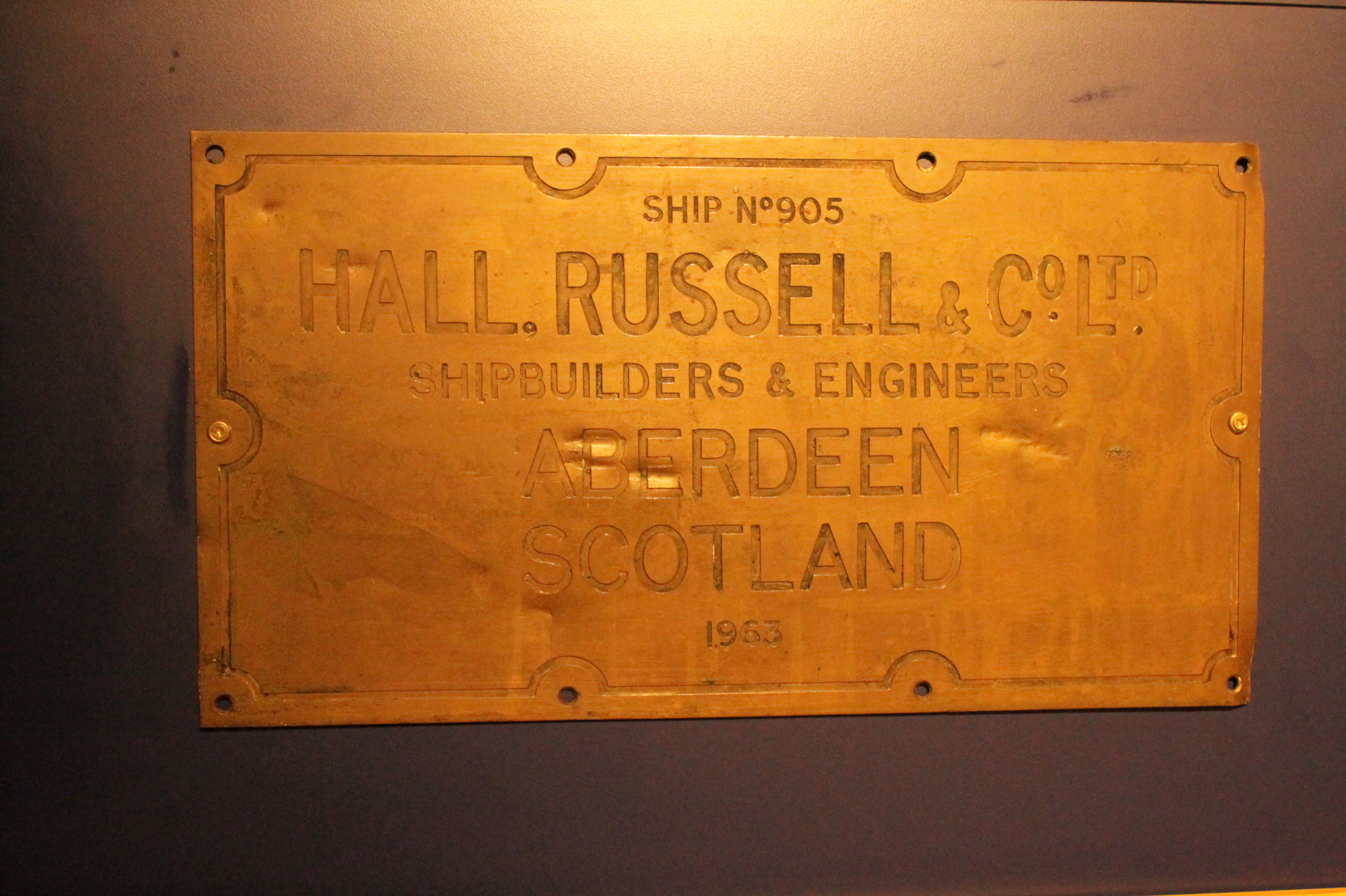
Hall, Russell and Co brass plaque

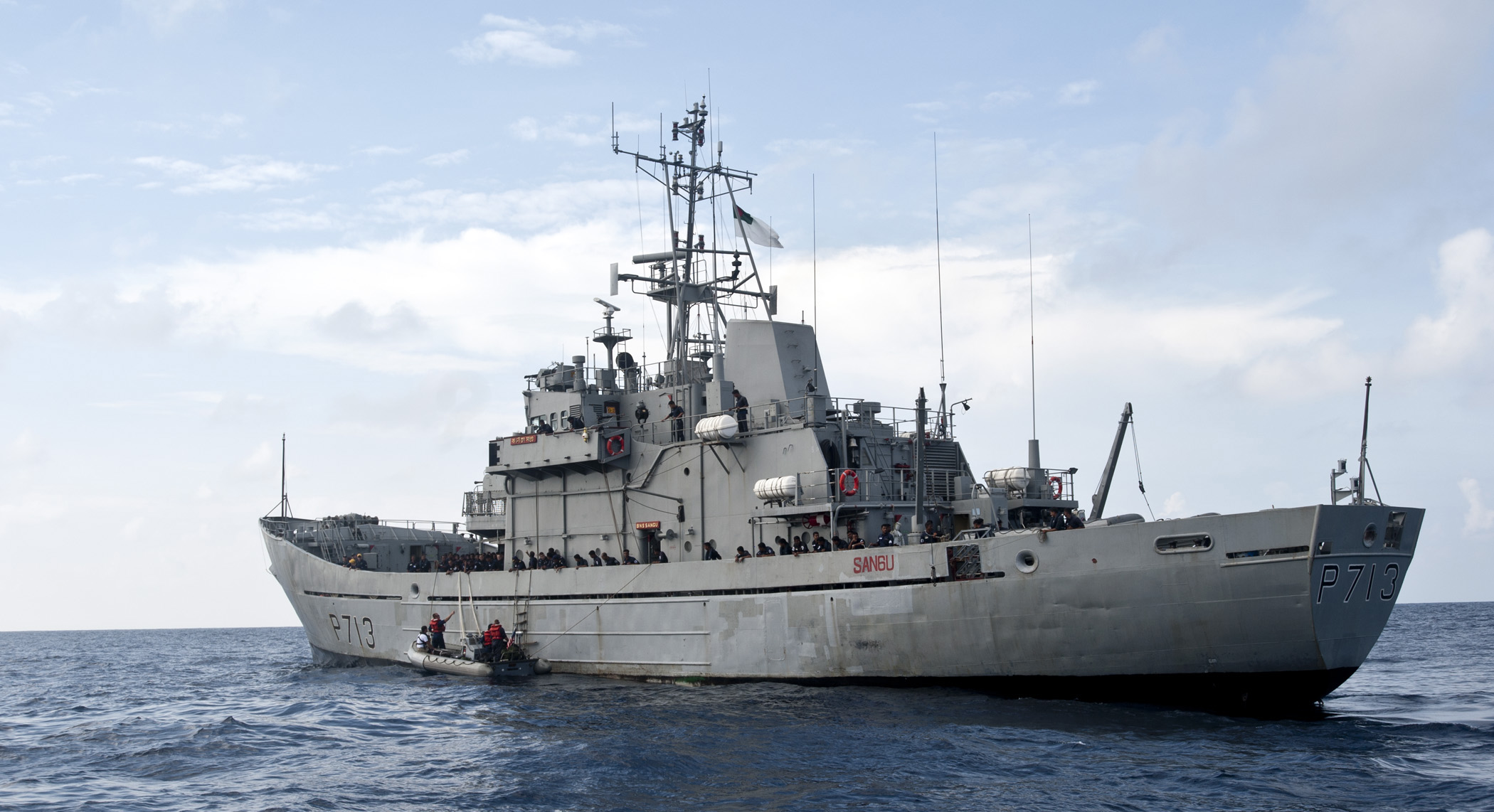
BNS Sangu operating in the Bay of Bengal

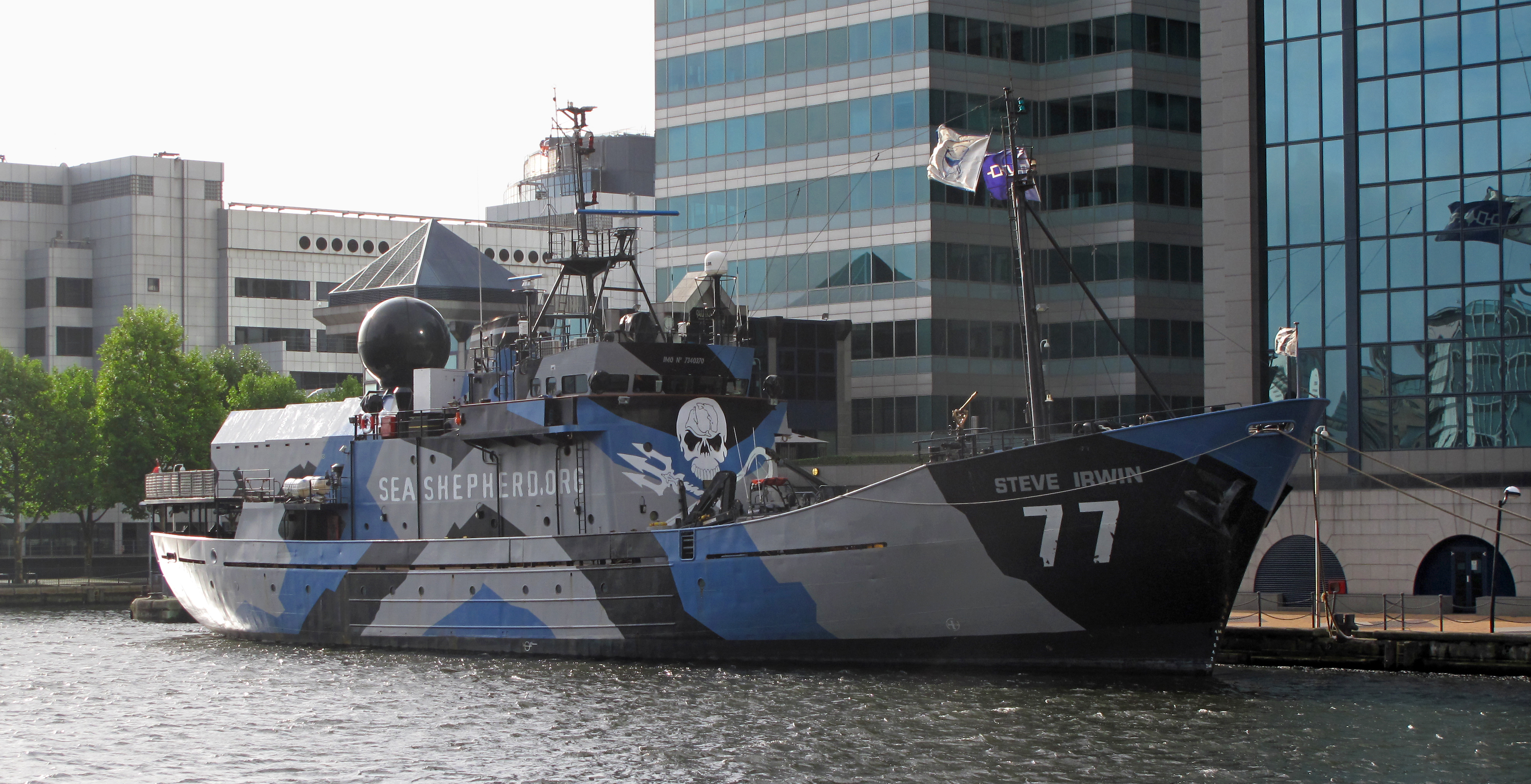
MY Steve Irwin moored in West India Docks, London, 2011

== See also ==
- List of ships built by Hall, Russell & Company
- Hall Russell United F.C. (Junior football club based in Bridge of Don)

== References and sources ==
Sources

- Stanley Bruce (2009). Hall Russell Remembered - Shipbuilding in Aberdeen 1864 to 1992. ISBN 978-1-907234-02-6.
