= List of films at the 2015 Sundance Film Festival =

The following is a list of all films shown at the 2015 Sundance Film Festival.

== Feature competition ==
The following films were shown in competition at the 2015 Sundance Film Festival.

=== U.S. Documentary ===
The following 16 films were selected for a world premiere in U.S. Documentary Competition program. Cartel Land by Matthew Heineman served as the opening film of the program.

Title	Director	Year	First showing
3½ MINUTES	Marc Silver	2015	January 24
Being Evel	Daniel Junge	2015	January 25
Best of Enemies	Morgan Neville and Robert Gordon	2014	January 23
Call Me Lucky	Bobcat Goldthwait	2014	January 27
Cartel Land	Matthew Heineman	2015	January 23
City of Gold	Laura Gabbert	2014	January 27
Finders Keepers	Bryan Carberry and Clay Tweel	2014	January 27
Hot Girls Wanted	Ronna Gradus and Jill Bauer	2014	January 24
How to Dance in Ohio	Alexandra Shiva	2015	January 25
Larry Kramer in Love and Anger	Jean Carlomusto	2014	January 23
Meru	Jimmy Chin and Elizabeth Chai Vasarhelyi	2014	January 23
Racing Extinction	Louie Psihoyos	2014	January 24
(T)ERROR	Lyric R. Cabral and David Felix Sutcliffe	2015	January 24
The Wolfpack	Crystal Moselle	2015	January 25
Welcome to Leith	Michael Beach Nichols and Christopher K. Walker	2014	January 26
Western	Bill Ross and Turner Ross	2014	January 25

=== U.S. Dramatic ===
The following 16 films were selected for a world premiere in U.S. Dramatic Competition program. The Bronze by Bryan Buckley served as the opening film of the program.

Title	Director	Year	First showing
Advantageous	Jennifer Phang	2015	January 26
The Bronze	Bryan Buckley	2015	January 22
The D Train	Andrew Mogel and Jarrad Paul	2014	January 23
The Diary of a Teenage Girl	Marielle Heller	2014	January 24
Dope	Rick Famuyiwa	2014	January 24
I Smile Back	Adam Salky	2014	January 25
Me and Earl and the Dying Girl	Alfonso Gomez-Rejon	2014	January 25
The Overnight	Patrick Brice	2014	January 23
People Places Things	James C. Strouse	2014	January 26
Results	Andrew Bujalski	2015	January 27
Songs My Brothers Taught Me	Chloé Zhao	2015	January 27
The Stanford Prison Experiment	Kyle Patrick Alvarez	2014	January 26
Stockholm, Pennsylvania	Nikole Beckwith	2014	January 23
Unexpected	Kris Williams	2015	January 25
The Witch	Robert Eggers	2014	January 27
Z for Zachariah	Craig Zobel	2014	January 24

=== World Cinema Documentary ===
The following 12 films were selected for a world premiere in World Cinema Documentary Competition program. How to Change the World by Jerry Rothwell served as the opening film of the program.

Title	Director	Year	First showing
The Amina Profile	Sophie Deraspe	2014	January 24
Censored Voices	Mor Loushy	2015	January 24
The Chinese Mayor	Hao Zhou	2014	January 26
Chuck Norris vs Communism	Ilinca Calugareanu	2014	January 23
Dark Horse	Louise Osmond	2014	January 23
Dreamcatcher	Kim Longinotto	2015	January 25
How to Change the World	Jerry Rothwell	2015	January 22
Listen to Me Marlon	Stevan Riley	2015	January 24
Pervert Park	Frida Barkfors and Lasse Barkfors	2014	January 23
The Russian Woodpecker	Chad Gracia	2014	January 24
Sembene!	Samba Gadjigo and Jason Silverman	2014	January 23
The Visit	Michael Madsen	2014	January 25

=== World Cinema Dramatic ===
The following 12 films were selected for a world premiere in World Cinema Dramatic Competition program. The Summer of Sangailé by Alantė Kavaitė served as the opening film of the program.

Title	Director	Year	First showing
Chorus	François Delisle	2014	January 2014
Cloro	Lamberto Sanfelice	2015	January 26
Glassland	Gerard Barrett	2014	January 23
Homesick	Anne Sewitsky	2014	January 23
Ivy	Tolga Karaçelik	2014	January 26
Partisan	Ariel Kleiman	2014	January 25
Princess	Tali Shalom Ezer	2014	January 23
The Second Mother	Anna Muylaert	2015	January 25
Slow West	John Maclean	2015	January 24
Strangerland	Kim Farrant	2014	January 23
The Summer of Sangailé	Alantė Kavaitė	2015	January 22
Umrika	Prashant Nair	2015	January 24

=== Next ===
The following 10 films were selected for a world premiere in Next program to highlight the American cinema. Christmas, Again by Charles Poekel served as the opening film of the program.

Title	Director	Year	First showing
Bob and the Trees	Diego Ongaro	2014	January 26
Christmas, Again	Charles Poekel	2014	January 23
Cronies	Michael Larnell	2014	January 25
Entertainment	Rick Alverson	2014	January 24
H.	Rania Attieh and Daniel Garcia	2014	January 25
James White	Josh Mond	2014	January 23
Nasty Baby	Sebastián Silva	2014	January 24
The Strongest Man	Kenny Riches	2014	January 25
Take Me to the River	Matt Sobel	2014	January 26
Tangerine	Sean S. Baker	2014	January 23

=== Short Programs ===
The following 60 short films were selected from a record 8,061 submissions.

==== USA Narrative Short Films ====
Title	Director	Country	Year	Minutes	First showing
Actresses	Jeremy Hersh	U.S.A.	2014	12	January 23
A.D. 1363, The End of Chivalry	Jake Mahaffy	U.S.A., New Zealand	2015	3	January 23
Color Neutral	Jennifer Reeves	U.S.A.	2014	7	January 26
Dog Bowl	Gordy Hoffman	U.S.A.	2014	19	January 28
Hugh the Hunter	Zachary Heinzerling	U.S.A.	2014	10	January 23
A Million Miles Away	Jennifer Reeder	U.S.A.	2014	28	January 30
Mulignans	Shaka King	U.S.A.	2014	5	January 23
Myrna the Monster	Ian Samuels	U.S.A.	2014	14	January 29
Oh Lucy!	Atsuko Hirayanagi	Japan, Singapore, U.S.A.	2014	21	January 27
Pink Grapefruit	Michael Mohan	U.S.A.	2015	9	January 23
Rabbit	Laure de Clermont-Tonnerre	France, U.S.A.	2014	17	January 23
SMILF	Frankie Shaw	U.S.A.	2014	9	January 23
Stop	Reinaldo Marcus Green	U.S.A.	2014	9	January 23
Superior	Erin Vassilopoulos	U.S.A.	2015	16	January 24

==== International Narrative Short Films ====
Title	Director	Country	Year	Minutes	First showing
Back Alley	Cécile Ducrocq	France	2014	29	January 30
The Chicken	Una Gunjak	Germany, Croatia	2014	15	January 22
Daytimer	Riz Ahmed	United Kingdom	2014	16	January 23
Followers	Tim Marshall	United Kingdom, Australia	2014	12	January 30
Great Northern Mountain	Amanda Kernell	Sweden	2015	15	January 24
Greenland	Oren Gerner	Israel	2014	17	January 24
Hole	Martin Edralin	Canada	2014	15	January 23
The Little Deputy	Trevor Anderson	Canada	2015	9	January 24
Out of Sight	Nick Rowland	United Kingdom	2014	28	January 31
Russian Roulette	Ben Aston	United Kingdom	2014	5	January 23
Saturday	Mike Forshaw	United Kingdom	2014	15	January 22
Spring	Tania Claudia Castillo	Mexico	2014	18	January 24
Take Me	Anaïs Barbeau-Lavalette and André Turpin	Canada	2014	10	January 24
VOLTA	Stella Kyriakopoulos	Greece	2014	12	January 24

==== Documentary Short Films ====
Title	Director	Country	Year	Minutes	First showing
The 414s: The Original Teenage Hackers	Michael T. Vollmann	U.S.A.	2015	12	January 26
Abandoned Goods	Pia Borg and Edward Lawrenson	United Kingdom	2014	38	January 24
The Collectors: Beekeeping	Steven Cantor	U.S.A.	2014	21	January 23
Every Day	Gabe Spitzer	U.S.A.	2014	12	January 22
The Face of Ukraine: Casting Oksana Baiul	Kitty Green	Australia	2015	8	January 24
Hotel 22	Elizabeth Lo	U.S.A.	2014	8	January 23
It's Me, Hilary: The Man Who Drew Eloise	Matt Wolf	U.S.A.	2014	36	January 29
Making it in America	Joris Debeij	U.S.A.	2014	9	January 29
{THE AND} Marcela & Rock	Topaz Adizes	U.S.A.	2014	13	January 31
Midnight Three & Six	Joe Callander	U.S.A.	2014	12	January 28
Object	Paulina Skibińska	Poland	2015	15	January 25
One Year Lease	Brian Bolster	U.S.A.	2014	11	January 24
Papa Machete	Jonathan David Kane	U.S.A.	2014	11	January 24
Pop-Up Porno: f4m	Stephen Dunn	Canada	2014	3	January 31
Pop-Up Porno: m4f	Stephen Dunn	Canada	2014	4	January 28
Pop-Up Porno: m4m	Stephen Dunn	Canada	2014	3	January 24
Serenity	Jack Dunphy	U.S.A.	2014	6	January 28
Starting Point	Michał Szcześniak	Poland	2014	26	January 31

==== Animated Short Films ====
Title	Director	Country	Year	Minutes	First showing
Bath House	Niki Lindroth von Bahr	Sweden	2014	15	January 23
Beach Flags	Sarah Saidan	France	2014	14	January 23
The Horse Raised By Spheres	David OReilly	U.S.A., Ireland	2014	3	January 31
Mynarski Death Plummet	Matthew Rankin	Canada	2014	8	January 31
OM Rider	Takeshi Murata	U.S.A.	2014	12	January 29
Palm Rot	Ryan Gillis	U.S.A.	2014	8	January 24
Storm hits jacket	Paul Cabon	France	2014	14	January 31
The Sun Like a Big Dark Animal	Christina Felisgrau and Ronnie Rivera	U.S.A.	2014	5	January 24
Symphony No. 42	Réka Bucsi	Hungary	2013	10	January 27
teeth	Daniel Gray and Tom Brown	United Kingdom, U.S.A., Hungary	2014	8	January 23
Tupilaq	Jakob Maqe	Denmark	2013	6	January 26
Two Films About Loneliness	William Bishop-Stephens and Christopher Eales	United Kingdom	2014	6	January 26
World of Tomorrow	Don Hertzfeldt	U.S.A.	2015	17	January 29

== Non-competition features ==
The following films were shown out of competition at the 2015 Sundance Film Festival.

=== Premieres ===
The following 18 feature films were selected for a world premiere in non-Competition program. A Walk in the Woods by Ken Kwapis served as the opening film of the program.

Title	Director	Year	First showing
A Walk in the Woods	Ken Kwapis	2014	January 23
Brooklyn	John Crowley	2014	January 26
Digging for Fire	Joe Swanberg	2015	January 26
Don Verdean	Jared Hess	2014	January 28
The End of the Tour	James Ponsoldt	2014	January 23
Experimenter	Michael Almereyda	2014	January 25
Grandma	Paul Weitz	2014	January 30
I Am Michael	Justin Kelly	2014	January 29
I'll See You in My Dreams	Brett Haley	2015	January 27
Last Days in the Desert	Rodrigo García	2014	January 25
Lila & Eve	Charles Stone III	2014	January 30
Mississippi Grind	Anna Boden and Ryan Fleck	2014	January 24
Mistress America	Noah Baumbach	2014	January 24
Seoul Searching	Benson Lee	2015	January 30
Sleeping with Other People	Leslye Headland	2015	January 24
Ten Thousand Saints	Shari Springer Berman and Robert Pulcini	2014	January 23
True Story	Rupert Goold	2014	January 23
Zipper	Mora Stephens	2014	January 27

=== Documentary premieres ===
The following 13 films were selected for Documentary Premieres program. What Happened, Miss Simone? by Liz Garbus served as the opening film of the program.

Title	Director	Year	First showing
Beaver Trilogy Part IV	Brad Besser	2015	January 23
The Black Panthers: Vanguard of the Revolution	Stanley Nelson Jr.	2015	January 23
Drunk Stoned Brilliant Dead: The Story of the National Lampoon	Douglas Tirola	2014	January 25
Fresh Dressed	Sacha Jenkins	2014	January 24
Going Clear: Scientology and the Prison of Belief	Alex Gibney	2014	January 25
The Hunting Ground	Kirby Dick	2014	January 23
In Football We Trust	Tony Vainuku and Erika Cohn	2014	January 23
Kurt Cobain: Montage of Heck	Brett Morgen	2015	January 24
The Mask You Live In	Jennifer Siebel Newsom	2014	January 23
Most Likely to Succeed	Greg Whiteley	2014	January 25
Prophet's Prey	Amy J. Berg	2015	January 26
Tig	Kristina Goolsby and Ashley York	2015	January 26
What Happened, Miss Simone?	Liz Garbus	2014	January 22

=== Spotlight ===
The following 9 films were selected for Spotlight program. 99 Homes by Ramin Bahrani served as the opening film of the program.

Title	Director	Year	First showing
6 Desires: DH Lawrence and Sardinia	Mark Cousins	2014	January 27
'71	Yann Demange	2014	January 24
99 Homes	Ramin Bahrani	2014	January 23
Aloft	Claudia Llosa	2014	January 26
Eden	Mia Hansen-Løve	2014	January 23
Girlhood	Céline Sciamma	2014	January 24
The Tribe	Myroslav Slaboshpytskiy	2014	January 24
White God	Kornél Mundruczó	2014	January 23
Wild Tales	Damián Szifrón	2014	January 23

=== Park City at Midnight ===
The following 8 films were selected for Park City at Midnight program. Knock Knock by Eli Roth served as the opening film of the program.

Title	Director	Year	First showing
Cop Car	Jon Watts	2014	January 24
The Hallow	Corin Hardy	2014	January 25
Hellions	Bruce McDonald	2014	January 25
It Follows	David Robert Mitchell	2014	January 24
Knock Knock	Eli Roth	2015	January 23
The Nightmare	Rodney Ascher	2014	January 26
Reversal	José Manuel Cravioto	2014	January 23
Turbo Kid	RKSS	2014	January 26

=== New Frontier Films ===
The following 19 films were selected for New Frontier Films program. The Royal Road by Jenni Olson served as the opening film of the program.

Title	Director	Year	First showing
The VR Works of Felix & Paul	Félix Lajeunesse and Paul Raphaël	2014	January 24
1979 Revolution Game	Navid Khonsari and Vassiliki Khonsari	2014	January 24
Assent	Oscar Raby	2014	January 31
Birdly	Max Rheiner	2014	January 23
Dérive	François Quévillon	2015	January 24
Evolution of Verse	Chris Milk	2015	January 24
Kaiju Fury!	Ian Hunter	2014	January 23
Possibilia	Daniel Kwan and Daniel Scheinert	2014	January 23
Project Syria	Nonny de la Peña	2014	January 31
Paradise	Pleix	2015	January 31
Perspective, Chapter 1: The Party	Rose Troche and Morris May	2015	January 31
Way to Go	Vincent Morisset	2014	January 24
Zero Point	Danfung Dennis	2015	January 24
The Forbidden Room	Guy Maddin and Evan Johnson	2014	January 26
Liveforever	Carlos Moreno	2014	January 26
The Royal Road	Jenni Olson	2015	January 23
Sam Klemke's Time Machine	Matthew Bate	2014	January 23
Station to Station	Doug Aitken	2014	January 25
Things of the Aimless Wanderer	Kivu Ruhorahoza	2014	January 26

=== Special Events ===
The following 3 films were selected for Special Events program. Misery Loves Comedy by Kevin Pollak served as the opening film of the program.

Title	Director	Year	First showing
Animals.	Phil Matarese and Mike Luciano	2015	January 26
The Jinx: The Life and Deaths of Robert Durst	Andrew Jarecki	2015	January 27
Misery Loves Comedy	Kevin Pollak	2014	January 23

=== Sundance Kids ===
The following 3 films were selected for Sundance Kids program. Operation Arctic by Grethe Bøe-Waal served as the opening film of the program.

Title	Director	Year	First showing
The Games Maker	Juan Pablo Buscarini	2014	January 24
Operation Arctic	Grethe Bøe-Waal	2014	January 24
Shaun the Sheep Movie	Richard Goleszowski and Mark Burton	2014	January 25

=== From the Collection ===
The following film was selected for From the Collection program.

Title	Director	Year	First showing
Paris Is Burning	Jennie Livingston	1991	January 26
