= Eco-Pirate: The Story of Paul Watson =

- Directed by: Trish Dolman
- Produced by: Kevin Eastwood; Trish Dolman
- Edited by: Brendan Woollard
- Music by: Michael Brook
- Production companies: Screen Siren Pictures; Optic Nerve Films
- Distributed by: eOne; Epix (USA)
- Release date: May 1, 2011 (Hot Docs)
- Running time: 110 min
- Country: Canada
- Language: English

Eco-Pirate: The Story of Paul Watson is a 2011 documentary film directed by Trish Dolman and produced by Kevin Eastwood. It follows radical conservationist Paul Watson during anti-whaling campaigns in the Antarctic in 2009 and 2010, and recounts his history and controversial methods as an activist and media personality. It premiered May 1, 2011 at the Hot Docs Documentary Film Festival.

== Synopsis ==
The film begins as Watson and members of the Sea Shepherd Conservation Society are arriving in the Southern Ocean Whale Sanctuary on board the RV Farley Mowat, in search of illegal whaling operations. They come upon the Japanese whaling supply vessel Oriental Bluebird and warn the crew to leave the area, but they refuse. Playing "Ride of the Valkyries" on a loudspeaker, the Farley Mowat then approaches and broadsides the Bluebird using a welded steel blade that protrudes from the hull of the boat—a demonstration of the kind of tactics Watson and the Sea Shepherds are known for.

The film then goes into an account of Watson's long and controversial history as an activist, going into depth about his role in co-founding Greenpeace, his subsequent disagreements with its other founders, and his separation from the organization to found his own Sea Shepherd Conservation Society. Using interviews with key figures in the environmental movement as well as news footage from the 1970s through the 2000s, the film recounts confrontations with various hunting and fishing bodies over the past 30 years which shaped Watson's methodology as an activist.

Throughout the film Watson faces problems with the international legal system, aging boats, inexperienced crew, fundraising, and criticism from his colleagues and family.

== Appearances ==
Eco-Pirate includes interviews with Paul Watson, Ross Wursthorne, Patrick Moore, Martin Sheen, Alex Cornelissen, Emily Hunter, Jeff Watkins, Peter Hammarstedt, Karen Sack, Rex Weyler, Bob Hunter, Paul Spong, Allison Lance, Lani Lum Watson, Chris Aultman, David Suzuki, Farley Mowat, Peter Garrett, Andrew Darby, Joji Morishita, Pablo Salas, Loyola Hearn, Anthony Kiedis, Pete Bethune, and Terri Irwin.

== Production ==
Eco-Pirate was shot over seven years in the Antarctic, the Galápagos Islands, North America, South America, Australia, and New Zealand.

In an interview with Point of View, Trish Dolman reports struggling to obtain fresh-sounding interviews from Watson since he is a consummate media-man and has told his stories so many times, particularly that of the 1975 confrontation with a Soviet whaling fleet and its prey. She says it took some "nudging" to get the vivid account he gives in the film.

The film includes an epilogue containing footage of the 2009-10 Antarctic Expedition "Operation: Waltzing Matilda" in which the Japanese whaling vessel MV Shonan Maru 2 collided with Sea Shepherd's MY Ady Gil, destroying the latter.

The film was produced with the participation of Superchannel, eOne, the Telefilm Canada Theatrical Documentary Program, and the Rogers Documentary Fund.

== Release ==
The film had its world premiere on May 1, 2011 at the Hot Docs Documentary Film Festival in Toronto. It opened theatrically on July 22, 2011 at the TIFF Bell Lightbox in Toronto, and Fifth Avenue Cinemas in Vancouver.

=== Reviews ===
Katherine Monk of the Vancouver Sun called Eco-Pirate a "thoroughly thought-provoking and emotionally poignant portrait of a Canadian outlaw" while praising director Dolman for maintaining distance from her subject: "She gets intimate material, but she’s clearly never seduced by Watson’s eco-charms to the point of being putty-headed."

Robert Bell of exclaim.ca criticized the film by calling it "a dissection of a Canadian figurehead [which] never finds its flow or footing."

However Drew Kerr of torontoscreenshots.com called the film "a well-rounded portrayal of the man", acknowledging its portrayal of Watson's "genius" and "oddball charm" while praising its use of interviews which are "highly critical" of him.

Referring to her balanced approach with the film, Watson was quoted in a Georgia Straight interview: "It’s down the middle. Trish has tried to present the side that opposes me and the side that supports me, and I think she did a good job on it."

The Globe and Mail praised the film as a "refreshingly rounded picture of a modern real-life action hero."

=== Awards ===
Eco-Pirate was nominated for Best Documentary at the 2011 Warsaw International Film Festival, it won the RIFF Environmental Award at the 2011 Reykjavík International Film Festival, and it won Best Documentary at the 2011 Projecting Change Film Festival where Watson himself introduced the film.

At the 2012 Leo Awards it was nominated for Best Direction in a Documentary Program or Series (Trish Dolman), Best Documentary (Trish Dolman and Kevin Eastwood, producers), Best Musical Score in a Documentary Program or Series (Michael Brook) and Best Picture Editing in a Documentary Program or Series (Brendan Woollard).
