= America Is Hard to See =

2018 documentary play

- Company: Life Jacket Theater Company
- Genre: Documentary play, with music
- Show type: Off-Broadway
- Date of premiere: January 30, 2018
- Final show: February 24, 2018
- Location: Here Arts Center, New York, N.Y.

Creative team
- Playwright, Director, Scenic Designer: Travis Russ
- Composer, lyricist, and music director: Priscilla Holbrook
- Costume designer: Andrea Hood
- Lighting designer: Solomon Weisbard
- Research & Development Team: Travis Russ, Anthony Dvarskas, and Amelia Parenteau
- Cast members: Ken Barnett, John Carlin, Joyce Cohen, Amy Gaither, David Spadora, Valerie Gareth Tidball
- Production Stage Manager: Kristina Vnook
- Casting Director: Dale Brown
- Line Producer: Ryan Bogner
- Press Agent: Matt Ross Public Relations
- Official website

America Is Hard to See is an Off-Broadway documentary play with eighteen "musical moments" sung by the cast members, either a capella or accompanying themselves on a piano, two acoustic guitars, and a banjo. It played at the Here Arts Center in New York from January 30 through February 24, 2018. It runs for 90 minutes, with no intermission.

== Miracle Village ==
The play is set in Miracle Village, a small community of sex offenders, located in the middle of sugar cane fields near rural Pahokee, Florida. The isolated community, which though small is the largest such community in the United States, formerly housed sugar cane workers, now replaced by machines. It was chosen because of its isolation, because laws in Florida, which takes pride in being the harshest state for sex offenders, restrict, sometimes severely, where they can live. (See Julia Tuttle Causeway sex offender colony.) There are six actors; all play more than one character. All are based on real people, although some characters are composites, or those who deal with them. Sometimes they address the audience directly. It is a "meta-textual experiment in which the audience is as much a part of the play as the actors and set. ...The plot has a way of entangling us into a world we would much rather keep at a safe distance, while simultaneously laying bare our perverse cultural appetite for the spectacle of criminality."

== Major characters ==
- The female lead is Patti, based on the real Patti Aupperlee, at the time Pastor of the First United Methodist Church of Pahokee, who attended a service in Miracle Village's tiny chapel and was moved by the music.
- The leading male character is Chad, based on real-life Chad Stoffel, "a former choir director who 'flunked out of gay rehab' after an inappropriate relationship with a male student".
- A young couple, new arrival Chris and Lexi, Patti's college-age daughter
- An older couple named Harry and Margaret.
- Elder statesman Thomas
- An unnamed therapist

"The audience first meets them under friendly circumstances. Later, they begin to hear their darker stories within the format of a group therapy session," and the therapist warns that the characters may not be telling their tales truthfully.

== Relationship with Pahokee ==
The play is not "solely about the sex offenders, but also about the nearby community of Pahokee that had to adjust to a new set of neighbors." In a review, the New York Times called it "an Our Town with sex offenders". Similar to Our Town, which is mentioned in the program notes, it is performed with minimal set and costumes. Before the play begins, audience members are invited to walk on what set there is: a canvas map covering the floor, showing the streets and houses of Miracle Village.

The script is by Travis Russ, who is also the director. The title of the play is a line from a poem of Robert Frost. (For the text of the poem, see Russo, Robert (February 19, 2018). "REVIEW: "America is Hard to See"". Stage Left.)

== Religion ==
Religion plays a major role. The central question is whether God's mercy and grace require us to forgive anyone repentant, or if there are crimes which can never be forgiven. According to Russ, "It became a play about humanity, and the flaws of humanity, and it became about faith and forgiveness and the limits of compassion."

"In a show with strong religious themes, salvation comes in the form of Pastor Patti (Amy Gaither Hayes), a local Methodist minister challenged by the existence of these pariahs and what it would mean to welcome them. No pious preacher, Pastor Patti, who has her own dark secret, is just trying to live her faith as she deals with these newcomers and the rest of her congregation." "The open-minded Patti...is able to unite the village residents and the neighboring churchgoers through a shared appreciation for religion and worship music."

== Music ==
According to Russ, "Music plays a huge role in this production. The lyrics help advance the narrative and humanize the characters. It softens the storyline. Music gives the audience the ability to look directly into a character’s soul and hear their truth."

Patti Aupperlee (not the play's character): "I was invited to attend a worship service in the chapel at Miracle Village. When I arrived with my family, I was astonished by the beautiful music that was being provided by the worship director [Stoffel]. It was like he was channeling music directly from God. It wasn’t at all like a performance; it was like a pure worship experience."

Reflecting this,

This show is verdant with music, a result of the team's observation that music has played a significant role in building bonds at Miracle Village. The show also yields two truths. First, sex offenders do commit egregious sins against our sense of community and innocence. Second, there do exist marginalized human beings who have served their time and we must decide, as a society, what becomes of them. To communicate this theatrically, Russ and Holbrook found music the most fluent medium. "In cinematic terms, it's the close up," Russ explains. "You can zoom in on somebody and see their soul. Music is poetry."

Everyone in the cast either sings or plays an instrument. Every line of every song is taken from the autobiographical statements by residents about their sex crimes, some of which have been published, Methodist hymns, or sermons of Methodist minister Auperlee, who welcomed them, not without misgivings, into her church.

Music and lyrics are by Priscilla Holbrook with the exception of the arrangement of the first hymn, the classic It Is Well with My Soul, by Chad Stoffel.

== Reviews ==
=== The New Yorker ===
"Dodging prurience and judgment, the piece, dotted with brief songs by Priscilla Holbrook, is a deceptively gentle look at redemption, faith (a local pastor emerges as a charismatic character), and what makes a community. Discomfort slowly seeps in as you find yourself sympathizing with some of the men, just as you remember that these seemingly nice guys were described as proficient liars. Under its plain exterior—the stage is nearly bare, the tone willfully low-key—the play is a heartbreaking, complicated portrait of people adrift."

=== Gay & Lesbian Review ===
"The absent narrator of America is Hard to See fills in as the public’s moral compass, one exposed as glaringly bankrupt.... Is this drama or investigative journalism, entertainment or 'fake news'? And how can anyone tell the difference? The audience cannot walk away from this piece without feeling incredibly uncomfortable and morally compromised."

=== Theatermania ===
"We leave not with the pleasantly dry feeling of having our minds made up, but of being awash in doubt: Should justice be more about punishment or reform? Can we call ourselves a free country when people who have served their time are marked forever with a scarlet letter? Are there crimes which are so abhorrent that reform is impossible?... Hands down, the bravest show currently playing in New York".

=== New York Times ===
"America Is Hard to See... arrives at an awkward time to ask for sympathy for these men: a moment when the culture is talking avidly about sexual predation and the damage it leaves behind. But this play, an investigation of transgression, redemption and the limits of compassion, takes a hard, uncomfortable look at forgiveness and what it means to put it into action.... The room was so pin-drop quiet that you could hear the electric hum of the lights".

== The Making of America is Hard to See ==
=== Fieldwork in Pahokee ===
Travis Russ said that informing his decision to research communities of sex offenders as a topic was the short story "Hands" by Sherwood Anderson. "It's very much about the gray areas of this man who's attracted to younger men.". It's one of Life Jacket's goals to tell stories about people "on the margins of society, the outsiders, the outcasts," according to Russ.

In the fall of 2015, a research team, consisting of Travis Russ, Anthony Dvarskas, and Amelia Parenteau, traveled to Pahokee, Florida, to research the "outcasts" (sex offenders) residing in Miracle Village, a few miles from the small city. They conducted 400+ hours of interviews with residents of Miracle Village, members of the United Methodist Church, and other Pahokee residents. They unearthed 300+ pages of archival documents (court records), and recorded thousands of pages of interviews and field notes. From this material each of the three went through highlighting what they thought was important.

Travis Russ: "We made several trips. We went into this community and we built connections and relationships from the ground up. A lot of the time, I was very surprised by how open and forthcoming the interviewees were in sharing their very complicated and complex stories." He found their stories "emotionally confusing". Amelia Parenteau commented at greater length: "We will have done our job if the audience has as many questions as we do. Researching this show asked us to take a long, hard look at the darkness of the human psyche. These stories ask us to contemplate fundamental structural tenets of society: justice, family, responsibility, healing, forgiveness, and rehabilitation."

A local television station, which claims it was their earlier story of February, 2015 that first introduced Russ to Miracle Village, did a news report on Russ and Parenteau during their visit.

=== First workshop (2016) ===
The play was workshopped October 11–24, 2016, in residence at IRT Theater, "a grassroots laboratory for independent theater and performance in New York City". It was presented October 21–23. "An ensemble of seven powerful actors embodies over 50 people in this dynamic play." The actors Andrew Dawson and Brendan Dalton participated in this workshop, which was attended by Patti Auperlee and her daughter Lexi. Chad Stoffel himself played the score.

=== Casting call (2017) ===
A casting call for seven actors, "able to sing with simplicity, warmth, and sincerity as well as in harmony", appeared in February, 2017 in Backstage. One actor had to be "proficient at playing guitar" and another "must be able to read music and be very proficient at playing piano". Rehearsals were March 13–17, 2017, with an invited showing March 19.

=== New York University Forum on Ethnodrama (2017) ===
Russ presented part of America Is Hard to See at the New York University Forum on Ethnodrama, April 21, 2017. In an interview, he said: "Our goal is to tell a story and make it engaging; [journalists'] is to report facts and help readers draw conclusions based on the facts. We uncover truth, not just facts, which makes theatre different." Russ does not give his actors access to the transcripts or recordings of the interviews used to create the show.

=== Second workshop (2017) ===
The play was workshopped August 14–20, 2017, at Make Room on Governors Island, a "free rehearsal space for artists to make and show vital work".
