= Julia Tuttle Causeway sex offender colony =

Homeless encampment in Miami, Florida

Coordinates: 25.8105°N 80.1735°W

The Julia Tuttle Causeway sex offender colony (also called "Bookville" by former residents) was an encampment of banished, registered sex offenders who were living beneath the Julia Tuttle Causeway—a highway connecting Miami, Florida to Miami Beach, Florida, United States—from 2006 to April 2010. The colony was created by a lobbyist named Ron Book, who wrote ordinances in several different Miami-Dade County cities to restrict convicted sex offenders from living within 2,500 feet (760 m) of schools, parks, bus stops, or homeless shelters. Since Book was also head of the Miami Homeless Trust, he was also in charge of finding housing for the released sexual offenders. Under these ordinances, the only areas where sex offenders could legally reside within Miami-Dade County were the Miami Airport and the Florida Everglades. Miami-Dade laws are significantly stricter than State of Florida laws on residency restrictions for sex offenders. Florida state law required that no sex offender could live within 1,000 feet (300 m) from "where children gather". Under that requirement, housing was possible; however, because of Book's lobbying, the Dade County Commission increased that number to 2,500 feet (760 m), thereby banishing hundreds of local citizens who then began gathering under the Julia Tuttle Causeway.

== Colony setup ==
Before the colony was established, the State of Florida provided sex offenders a list of locations where they could live that did not violate the boundaries set by the City of Miami, but the closest was in adjacent Broward County. (Broward County also has a serious problem with homeless sex offenders.) Although the Florida Department of Corrections initially denied that they were forcing the offenders to live under the bridge, the Miami New Times reported that internal communications in the Department of Corrections proved this was false, that released offenders were told to live in the colony or face more jail time, and sex offenders who were released were issued driver licenses by the State of Florida listing their addresses as the Julia Tuttle Causeway.

As many as 140 people lived in the colony in July 2009. They were required to be in the camp overnight from 6 pm to 7 am, when a representative from the Department of Corrections arrived to check that they were there. Most of the structures in the encampment, described by The Miami Herald as a "shantytown", were tents, improvised wood, or cardboard structures. Some had plumbing and cooking capacities, and residents of the colony shared generators for electricity, only used to recharge cell phones and the tracking devices they were required to wear.

== Conflicts over responsibility ==
As the number of residents grew, the City of Miami and the State of Florida disagreed over who was ultimately responsible for the sex offenders. Miami City Commissioner Marc Sarnoff, worried about how tourists perceived the colony, prompted an attorney from the Florida Department of Corrections to write a letter to the City of Miami absolving the Department of responsibility. The City of Miami responded by filing a lawsuit against the state, citing public health and safety concerns. The American Civil Liberties Union (ACLU) had also filed a lawsuit against the City of Miami for imposing the 2,500-foot (760 m) rule for sex offenders when the State of Florida's law restricts them to 1,000 feet (300 m) from where children congregate. The ACLU said that the 1,000-foot (300 m) rule would allow many of the offenders to return home. The camp was under further scrutiny for being within the forbidden area; a city park on an island in Biscayne Bay caused questions about the Julia Tuttle Causeway colony's itself being in violation of the sex offender laws.

Local clergyman Vincent Spann likened the camp to a Biblical leper colony and offered to house the sex offenders in a manner similar to that which he employed to treat those recovering from drug and alcohol addiction. He predicted it would cost more than a million dollars a year. In September 2009, a judge responding to the lawsuit filed by the ACLU ruled that the City of Miami was allowed to set its own ordinances. The ACLU promised to appeal the decision. As of 2009 Miami was facing other lawsuits about moving the sex offenders. In February 2010 Miami-Dade County passed a new ordinance that still prevented sex offenders from living within 2,500 feet (760 m) of schools but only forbade them from living within 1,000 feet (300 m) of places such as parks and daycares. The county also made this ordinance effective throughout the whole county and declared any stricter ordinances passed by other Miami-Dade cities to be superseded and repealed. With this new county ordinance, various pockets of the county were now legal for sex offenders to live in, and most, but not all, of the sex offenders ceased to be homeless. Previously, the sex offenders had been banned in most parts of the county from living within 2,500 feet (760 m) of schools, daycare centers, parks, and in some places even school bus stops. As of March 2015, however, the problem continues.

== Attempts to relocate colony residents ==
Throughout the camp's existence, the Miami-Dade County Homeless Trust, an organization tasked by the county to help end street homelessness in Miami-Dade County, had been working to find permanent housing for all of the sex offenders living under the bridge. The trust is chaired by Ron Book, the lobbyist who helped write and pass into law the 2,500-foot (760 m) restriction, prompted by the abuse of his daughter at the hands of a hired caretaker. On April 15, 2010, the Trust moved the last of the sex offenders living under the bridge into other housing. However, further protest from nearby communities ensued. Several former residents of the encampment were evicted from a Miami hotel in late April 2010.

In November 2011, the Miami Herald reported on the fate of the former Julia Tuttle Causeway colony, which former residents nicknamed "Bookville". Analysts studying the colony unanimously agreed on two relevant issues: the inability to find a stable home for offenders increased the risk that they would re-offend, and the close proximity of offenders to schools or parks did not increase the possibility that past offenders would re-offend. Despite these findings, Book solicited for and applied federal stimulus money to buy short-term stays for offenders, eventually costing US$1,000 a month which, as noted by the Herald, would have been unnecessary without the more stringent law that Book championed. This is incorrect according to David Raymond, former executive director of the Homeless Trust: federal Stimulus funds were never utilized for this population in Miami-Dade County; the funds used were from the local Homeless Food & Beverage Tax. Rent subsidies, along with job placement services and case management, were provided for up to six months.

Residents of Miami's Shorecrest neighborhood protested about the 13 sex offenders who had relocated there. Book placed another 43 offenders in a trailer park also housing many children. Book forewarned that the stimulus funds for housing the sex offenders would run out. The Herald reported that out of 1,960 sex offenders who had registered to live in Miami-Dade, 256 stopped reporting their locations to authorities.

Throughout 2013 and 2014, evidence began to reach the news media that there was still a problem of homelessness amongst Miami-Dade sex offenders, despite the county's relaxation of the residency restrictions. Almost all of the Julia Tuttle Causeway residents found homes immediately after the camp was cleared, but many were once again homeless. A hotel that once housed many of the Causeway's former residents ended up evicting all sex offenders from the hotel after one was arrested for re-offending. Ron Book later found housing for many sex offenders in a trailer park. However, Book himself evicted the sex offenders from the trailer park after deciding that a nearby youth shelter was legally considered a school. Miami City Commissioner Mark Sarnoff has criticized the problem of homeless sex offenders in the county. However, Sarnoff himself has built miniature "pocket parks" in order to prevent sex offenders from being able to move into the Little River area of Miami, which Sarnoff represents. Now, many of the homeless sex offenders are sleeping on railroad tracks (although most have homes during the day since the Miami-Dade residency restriction only applies from 10 pm to 6 am.) In October 2014, the ACLU announced plans to again sue the county over the residency restrictions. A similar lawsuit by the ACLU against Miami-Dade County failed in the 2009 case Exile v. Miami-Dade County, when it was ruled that Florida law does not prevent localities from enacting stricter sex offender residency restrictions. (This is contrary to a New Jersey Supreme Court ruling that invalidated local sex offender ordinances on those grounds.)

When Hurricane Irma hit in September 2017, there were 233 sex offenders registered "to the area of NW 71st Street and NW 36th Court" in Hialeah, Florida, i.e., adjacent to the train tracks. This number has grown to about 300. Miami-Dade County, in response to the "squalid" conditions, health hazards, and complaints from local businesses, announced that as of May 6, 2018, camping on public property will become illegal.

== In fiction ==
The colony figures in the plot of the Dexter episode "First Blood" (season 5, 2010). The title character Dexter Morgan hunts there for a man he suspects of multiple rapes and murders.

Whidbey, the novel by T. Kira Madden, published March, 2026 includes frequent mentions of the colony. Child sexual abuse is the subject of the novel with viewpoints from one of the survivors and the sexual offender’s mother.

== Media attention ==
A media crew, Arte G.E.I.E from Germany, covered the story in depth, by filming a 30-minute documentary in 2010. National US television news magazine programs offered little coverage, and no American documentary had ever been broadcast on the topic.

This American Life aired the story on their May 10, 2010 radio series episode titled "The Bridge".

== See also ==
- 101st kilometre
- Miracle Park (community)
- Florida Civil Commitment Center
- State of Georgia v. Allison
- Pervert Park
