= How to Change the World =

- Directed by: Jerry Rothwell
- Written by: Jerry Rothwell
- Produced by: Al Morrow; Bous de Jong
- Starring: Robert Hunter
- Narrated by: Barry Pepper
- Cinematography: Ben Lichty
- Edited by: James Scott
- Music by: Lesley Barber
- Production companies: Insight Productions; MET Films; BFI
- Distributed by: Picturehouse Entertainment
- Release dates: 22 January 2015 (Sundance Film Festival); 11 September 2015 (United Kingdom)
- Running time: 112 minutes
- Countries: United Kingdom; Canada
- Language: English

How to Change the World is a 2015 documentary film directed and written by Jerry Rothwell (Deep Water). It documents how the founding members of Greenpeace created the green movement.

== Synopsis ==
In 1971, a small group of activists sailed from Vancouver, Canada in a fishing boat to try to stop Richard Nixon's nuclear bomb tests in Amchitka, Alaska. Their actions caught the attention of the public and this eventually led to a worldwide green movement and pioneered the foundation of Greenpeace.

The film centers on activist Robert Hunter and his part in the creation of Greenpeace, which is structured by the five rules of engagement from Hunter's writings.

== Cast ==
- Barry Pepper as the voice of Bob Hunter, serving as narrator
- Bill Darnel
- David Garrick
- Bobbi Hunter
- Emily Hunter
- Will Jackson
- George Korotva
- Myron McDonald
- Rod Marining
- Patrick Moore
- Ron Precious
- Paul Spong
- Carlie Truman
- Paul Watson
- Rex Weyler

== Release and marketing ==
The documentary first premiered at the 2015 Sundance Film Festival, winning the World Cinema Documentary Special Jury Award for Editing and the Candescent Award. A first trailer was released on July 30, 2015.

On September 9, 2015, Picturehouse screened the documentary in 120 U.K. and 70 U.S. cinemas, (presented with Fathom Events stateside), followed by a satellite Q&A with Rothwell, fashion designer and Greenpeace supporter Vivienne Westwood and daughter of the first president of Greenpeace, Emily Hunter.

== Reception ==
The film received positive reviews. The review aggregator website Rotten Tomatoes reported an 86% approval rating, with a rating average of 8/10.

Dennis Harvey praised the film in Variety noting, "The goldmine of 16mm color footage, whose propagandic value participants were quite cognizant of at the time, is in mint condition, showing the excitement and fun of the movement in its earliest days." Kate Taylor from The Globe and Mail gave the film 3 out of 4 stars, adding that "Whatever you think of Greenpeace's less well-considered antics over the years, How to Change the World is a compelling story of one environmentalist's remarkable combination of prescience, grit and timing." The Toronto Star wrote "Almost a "found footage" movie, it makes excellent use of 1,500 archived 16 mm reels supplemented with fresh interviews and some animation."

=== Accolades ===
The film has received various accolades such as those listed below.

Year	Award	Category	Result
2015	Sundance Film Festival	World Doc Special Jury Award: Editing	Won
2015	Sundance Film Festival	Candescent Award	Won
2015	Sheffield Documentary Festival	Best Environmental Documentary	Won
2015	Sebastopol Documentary Festival	Best Feature	Won
2015	Portland EcoFilm Festival	Best Feature Film	Won
2015	Hot Docs	Top Ten Audience Favourite	Won
2016	4th Canadian Screen Awards	Best Feature Length Documentary	Nominated
2016	4th Canadian Screen Awards	Best Editing in a Documentary	Won
