= Miracle Village =

Community east of Pahokee, Florida, USA

City of Refuge
- Nickname: Miracle Village
- Location within Florida Location within the United States
- Coordinates: 26.8124°N 80.6114°W
- Country: United States
- State: Florida
- County: Palm Beach
- Founded: 1964

Government
  - Type: Operated by Matthew 25: Ministries
  - Executive Director: Ted Rodarm

Population
  - Estimate (2018): 200
- Time zone: UTC-5 (Eastern (EST))
  - Summer (DST): UTC-4 (EDT)

Miracle Village (officially City of Refuge since 2014) is a community on Muck City Road, about three miles (4.8 km) east of Pahokee, Florida, that serves as a haven for registered sex offenders. It is located within one of the most isolated and poorest parts of Palm Beach County. The site was chosen because of its isolation given that the sex offender residence restrictions do not apply.

== Description ==
The complex of 54 duplexes and six family homes is operated by Matthew 25: Ministries, an organization with the stated goal of providing prison aftercare. The Executive Director in 2017 was Ted Rodarm, himself an ex-offender. In October 2010, the community included 66 registered sex offenders; by July 2013, there were 100; and by 2017, it held 120. The total population as of 2018, including family members, was 200. It is the largest community of registered sex offenders in the United States. There are an additional 300 who have resided there but since moved on.

An affiliated organization, Miracle Village Ministries, provides services including transportation to newly released prisoners. It describes itself on its website as "a faith-based prison aftercare ministry".

Previously, the complex was known as Pelican Lake. It was built by U.S. Sugar in 1964 as housing for migrants working the sugar cane fields, now replaced by machinery. After working out a deal with Matthew 25 Ministries to lease the property, the owner, Alston Management Inc., informed residents with school-age children that they would have to leave or be evicted.

Federal law prohibits discrimination against families with children, except in certain cases such as communities for the elderly. Witherow was sued by the Legal Aid Society of Palm Beach County and the Florida Equal Justice Center on behalf of some residents. In 2011, a federal judge found that Matthew 25 Ministries and Alston Management had violated the Federal Fair Housing Act.

== Relations with Pahokee ==
Miracle Village's relations with nearby Pahokee were initially difficult, but have improved considerably. The day Pat Powers, a resident and the village manager, first approached the City Council in nearby Pahokee, "We were the plague. They wanted to hang us. They wanted to knock the crap out of us and they had to give us a police escort to leave."

The mayor in 2009, Wayne Whitaker, stated that he was unaware that offenders were being recruited to live there and that he believed having so many live together would be "very, very risky".

== Media attention ==
=== Radio ===
National Public Radio's All Things Considered covered the town in 2009.

=== Photography ===
==== Noah Rabinowitz ====
On assignment for the German magazine Süddeutsche Zeitung (South German Times), American photographer Noah Rabinowitz took a series of photos of Miracle Village. They were published in 2013, with a 4,000 word article in the magazine.

==== Sofía Valiente ====
In 2014, photographer Sofía Valiente, who lives in nearby Belle Glade, published a book with the simple title of Miracle Village. The unpaged book contains pictures of Miracle Village and its sex offender residents. Along with an introduction by resident Joseph Steinberg, describing what it is like to be picked up at the prison gate and driven to Miracle Village, the book reproduces 11 handwritten statements by registrants describing their offenses, plus a Dear John letter from an offender's wife saying she wants a divorce. Of her work, Valiente said: "It is not just a documentary record of a shunned community, but an argument for understanding, rehabilitation, even forgiveness."

==== Charles Ommanney ====
Photographer Charles Ommanney lived at Miracle Village for a week with the residents and in 2017 published 10 photographs, with brief commentary, in Politico magazine.

=== Movies and Television ===
==== Banished ====
Banished is a 15-minute video by reporter Aaron Thomas and produced by Journeyman.tv in 2013, which aired in 2014 on SBS Australia. It concludes with a focus on Pahokee's pastor Patti Auperlee, who has helped the sex offenders be accepted by the wider community.

==== Sex Offender Village ====
A New York Times "Op-Doc" (see Op-Ed) video from May 21, 2013, focuses on the problems of the residents, many of whom are interviewed.

==== Second Chance Sex Offenders ====
On January 24, 2018, the BBC released its 58-minute documentary Stacey Dooley Investigates: Second Chance Sex Offenders, whose topic is Florida's sex offender policies, the toughest in the nation. Reporter Stacey Dooley interviews some officials who are hostile to sex offenders and believe they can never be rehabilitated, such as Florida Senator Lauren Book and Bradford County Sheriff Gordon Smith. She concludes with Miracle Village.

==== Criminal Minds ====
Season 11, Episode 6 “Pariahville” of the television series Criminal Minds takes place in a fictionalized version of Miracle Village called “Glenport Village”.

=== Play ===
==== America is Hard To See (Off-Broadway play) ====
A research team from the Life Jacket Theater Company visited Pahokee for a week in October 2015. Based on interviews, autobiographical statements, and court records the team collected, the Company presented America Is Hard to See in January and February 2018. The play is a fusion of personal interviews and texts written by the residents, with traditional Methodist hymns, lines from the sermons of Patti Auperlee, and original songs composed by Priscilla Holbrook. The central theme is whether there are limits to grace, whether or not sex offenders — all of them — can ever be forgiven.

Except for the hymns, each line of the eighteen songs is taken from the transcript of a statement by a Miracle Village resident, or from a sermon by Pastor Aupperlee.

== See also ==
- 101st kilometre
- Florida Civil Commitment Center
- Lishenets
- Pervert Park
- Julia Tuttle Causeway sex offender colony
