= Wellpath =

American healthcare company

- Type: Private
- Industry: Healthcare, Incarceration, Illegal immigration
- Predecessor: Correct Care Solutions
- Founded: 2003
- Founder: Jerry Boyle
- Headquarters: 1283 Murfreesboro Road, Nashville, Tennessee, United States
- Key people: Jerry Boyle (Chairman); Jorge A. Dominicis (Chief Executive Officer & President)
- Revenue: $1.17 billion (2017)
- Website: wellpathcare.com

Wellpath, formerly known as Correct Care Solutions is a healthcare company based in Nashville, Tennessee, U.S. and "one of the nation’s largest for-profit healthcare providers for prisoners." The company was founded in 2003 by Jerry Boyle. Currently, Wellpath is owned by private equity firm H.I.G. Capital and was formerly co-owned by Audax Group and Frazier Healthcare Partners. Wellpath's facilities exist in both the United States and Australia. Currently, there are 550 centers in 36 states. Their facilities treat around 300,000 patients per day. It operates the Florida Civil Commitment Center in Arcadia, Florida. Wellpath and CCS have been sued more than 1300 times for inadequate care according to a story in the Augusta Chronicle on January 12, 2019.

In November 2024, Wellpath filed for Chapter 11 bankruptcy after being unable to meet debt commitments, as well as high rising and labor costs. The company listed assets and liabilities between $1 billion and $10 billion.

On January 8, 2025, Wellpath received court approval to sell off its behavioral health division, Wellpath Recovery Solutions, to lenders, in an effort to eliminate over $375 million of Wellpath's debt.

== Divisions ==
In 2018, Correct Care Solutions merged with Correctional Medical Group to create Wellpath. Correct Care Solutions had acquired Conmed Healthcare Management in 2012. As of 2019 the company is made up of three divisions including local detentions, federal and state prisons, and inpatient and residential treatment facilities.

=== Local Detentions ===
Wellpath operates within county jails and community facilities. They have dispatching providers and clinical staff servicing 394 facilities throughout the United States.

=== Federal and State Prisons ===
Immigrant-only prisons across the United States are also recipients of healthcare from Wellpath, including immigrant-only prisons run by the GEO Group. Wellpath is contracted with over 140 detention facilities, both adult and juvenile, throughout the United States. Healthcare services provided include: pharmacy management, electronic medical records, claims adjudication, as well as mental and behavioral health programming.

=== Inpatient and Residential Treatment Facilities ===
In addition to the operation within inpatient and residential treatment facilities throughout the United States, Wellpath offers services within forensic state hospitals and provides sex offender treatment and competency restoration programs in Texas, Washington, South Carolina, Massachusetts, Florida, California, and Colorado.

== Services ==
Wellpath provides all of the following services for over 300,000 incarcerated adults and children through their nearly 15,000 workers. Below is a comprehensive list of services provided:

- Medical care
- Dental care
- Optical care
- Mental healthcare
- Competency restoration
- On-site care
- Receiving screenings
- Triage and sick call
- Suicide prevention/intervention
- Substance abuse/detox programs
- Comprehensive health appraisals
- Radiology and laboratory services
- Medically necessary diet programs
- Special needs and chronic care
- Continuity of care and discharge planning
- Collaboration with community services agencies
- Network development
- Hiring/staffing
- Recruitment/retention plans
- Patient health education and awareness programs
- Facility/custody/law enforcement staff training programs
- Emergency and hospitalization arrangements
- Utilization management
- Pharmaceutical supply and medication management
- Third-party reimbursement follow-up and processing
- Cost recovery programs
- Continuous Quality Improvement Program (CQIP)
- National Accreditation – NCCHC/ACA/CALEA/TJC/CARF

== Special services ==
Electronic Records Management Application (ERMA)

ERMA is Wellpath's electronic record management system that optimizes patient care within various facilities. ERMA maintains records of all interactions between health care providers and the patients.

Medicated Assisted Treatment (MAT)

The MAT program is dedicated to combating substance abuse within Wellpath's patient populations. This program's primary goals include “detoxification, relapse prevention, or opioid maintenance.” To achieve these goals, a holistic approach is taken with substance abuse therapy by combining pharmacological therapy with behavioral therapy to maximize therapeutic benefits.

Restoring Individuals Safely and Effectively (RISE)

RISE is dedicated to helping inmates improve their mental health and cognitive abilities in preparation for defending themselves in future court hearings. Within this program, patients are initially assessed by a medical team to determine their clinical needs. After complete assessment, inmates are treated via an approach that focuses on addressing trauma and psychiatric care in order to restore mental health status as quickly as possible. An important note is that the RISE program has been built upon heavy research. Thus, clinical strategies utilized in this program are backed by strong data from the literature.

== Litigation ==
On May 16, 2017, Texas Democratic state Senator Carlos Uresti was indicted by a federal grand jury in the United States District Court for the Western District of Texas for conspiracy to commit bribery and conspiracy to commit money laundering. Uersti is alleged to have originally taken money from Physicians Network Associates (PNA), which was awarded a contract for medical services at the GEO Group operated, Reeves County Detention Complex, near Pecos, Texas and that the scheme continued through PNA's successor company. The indictment claims acting Reeves County administrator, Judge Jimmy Galindo, conspired With Uresti to approve the medical contract through the county commissioners court in exchange for kickbacks and "promises of future payments." PNA hired Uresti, ostensibly as a "consultant" for "marketing services" but the prosecution claims in fact Uresti became the middleman for bribe money destined for Galindo. PNA was subsequently absorbed by Correctional Healthcare Companies in 2010, which then merged with Correct Care Solutions, in 2014. PNA and its successor corporations continued to pay Uresti $10,000 monthly, starting in September 2006, for the next ten years. Uresti is alleged to have split those bribes with Galindo. The case was scheduled to be tried on January 4, 2018.

The quality of and access to health care in immigration detention centers have recently been a focus of attention in the media. CNN has conducted an investigation which uncovered the deaths as well as the avoidable, serious health outcomes that are attributed to substandard health care provided in these detention centers—which was the responsibility of Wellpath. Federal lawsuits of Wellpath can be found online and in public record. According to an investigation by nonpartisan independent group named Project on Government Oversight, Wellpath and the companies that merged to create it have a litigation history of at least 1,395 lawsuits. Lawsuits range from stolen items to substandard care of pregnant inmates and medical errors.
