= Robert Hunter (journalist) =

Canadian environmentalist, journalist, author and politician (1941 – 2005)

Robert Lorne Hunter (October 13, 1941 – May 2, 2005) was a Canadian environmentalist, journalist, author and politician. He was a member of the Don't Make a Wave Committee in 1969, and a co-founder of Greenpeace in 1971 and its first president. He led the first on-sea anti-whaling campaigns in the world, against Russian and Australian whalers, which helped lead to the ban on commercial whaling. He campaigned against nuclear testing, the Canadian seal hunt and later, climate change with his book Thermageddon: Countdown to 2030. He was named by Time as one of the "Eco-Heroes" of the 20th century.

== Biography ==
Born in St. Boniface, Manitoba, Hunter's career in journalism began in the 1960s at the Winnipeg Tribune and the Vancouver Sun, where he focused on the counterculture as well as environmental issues. Beginning in 1988, he worked as a commentator and reporter for Toronto's Citytv and, since its launch, its all-news sister channel CP24. He created many documentaries about Canada's north that are still often aired on CP24 during off-peak hours. He was also the longtime "Enviro" columnist in Toronto's eye weekly.

=== Environmental activism ===
Robert Hunter was on the first expedition of the Don't Make a Wave Committee in 1971, titled Greenpeace I. This was a halibut seiner by the name of Phyllis Cormack, chartered to travel to Amchitka in an unsuccessful attempt to halt the underground nuclear bomb test codenamed Cannikin by the United States military beneath the island of Amchitka, Alaska.

In 1975, Robert Hunter led the Greenpeace expedition against the Soviet whaling fleet, along with lifelong friend and activist Paul Watson and Patrick Moore. The expedition chartered the Phyllis Cormack again, and pioneered using inflatable zodiacs as a shield between the harpoon and the whale.

He participated on many Greenpeace and Sea Shepherd Conservation Society campaigns, and was on the advisory board for the Sea Shepherd Conservation Society for several years. A Sea Shepherd vessel was named for him after his death.

=== Politics ===
Hunter surprised many when he entered politics as a candidate for the Ontario Liberal Party in a 2001 provincial by-election in Beaches—East York. Hunter's environmentalism had led many to assume that his politics were more in line with the New Democratic Party or the Greens, and he had frequently criticized Liberal politicians in his columns. The by-election campaign became bitter in its final days when sections of Hunter's 1988 travelogue On the Sky were faxed to Hunter's opponents. (The origin of the fax was never confirmed.) The excerpt were used by a New Democratic opponent, Marilyn Churley, to attack Hunter's personal integrity.

In the end, Hunter lost by almost 4,000 votes to Michael Prue of the NDP. However, despite these results, Hunter in 2002 called for the Liberals and the Green Party of Ontario to form an electoral alliance.

=== Author ===
Hunter wrote numerous books on environmental subjects. In 1991, he won the Governor General's Award for literature for his book Occupied Canada: A Young White Man Discovers His Unsuspected Past. He also wrote on matters relating to aboriginal rights in Canada and remained in contact with Greenpeace and other environmental groups until his death.

=== Death ===
Hunter was diagnosed with prostate cancer in 1998. After his doctor told him that his prostate cancer was incurable, Hunter went to the Hospital Santa Monica, in Mexico, founded by Kurt Donsbach, an American naturopathic doctor and chiropractor. Hunter started treatment in December 2004, and reported progress, but died on May 2, 2005.

His ashes were scattered in northern Canada near the Arctic on a canoeing trip, at Tortuga Bay in the Galapagos Islands, and on top of an Antarctic iceberg during the 2005/2006 Sea Shepherd campaign against whaling by the Japanese whaling fleet in the Southern Ocean Whale Sanctuary.

He is survived by his wife Bobbi, and his four children Emily, Will, Conan and Justine. Hunter had four grandchildren at the time of his death.

=== Legacy ===
In 2015, a documentary film was released at Sundance Film Festival titled How to Change the World, directed by Jerry Rothwell. The film is about the legacy of Robert Hunter and the origins of Greenpeace. A review by IndieWire says, "In How to Change The World, director Jerry Rothwell unearths extraordinary footage to tell a story about fighting for a cause — both by outlining the terms of the fight and the people engaged in it."

Bob Hunter Memorial Park in Markham was named in his honour. Part of the Rouge Park system, the park is bounded by a rail corridor, west of Ninth Line and east of Reesor Road, south of Highway 407 and north of Steeles Avenue East.

The park was opened by his family and Premier Dalton McGuinty on August 21, 2006.

== Books by Hunter ==
- Hunter, Robert (1968). Erebus. New York, Grove Press.
- Hunter, Robert (1970). The Enemies of Anarchy. McClelland & Stewart. ISBN 0-7710-4293-0.
- Hunter, Robert (1971). The Storming of the Mind. McClelland & Stewart. ISBN 0-7710-4294-9.
- Hunter, Robert and Rex Weyler (1978). To Save a Whale: The Voyages of Greenpeace. Chronicle Books. ISBN 0-87701-114-1.
- Hunter, Robert (1979). Warriors of the Rainbow: A Chronicle of the Greenpeace Movement. Henry Holt and Company, Inc. ISBN 0-03-043741-5.
- Hunter, Robert (1980). The Greenpeace Chronicle. Pan Books. ISBN 0-330-25939-3.
- Hunter, Robert (1985). Cry Wolf!. Shepherds of the Earth Publications.
- Hunter, Robert (1988). On the Sky: Zen and the Art of International Freeloading. McClelland & Stewart. ISBN 0-7710-4289-2.
- Hunter, Robert and Robert Calihoo (1991). Occupy Canada. McClelland & Stewart. ISBN 0-7710-4295-7.
- Hunter, Robert (1999). Red Blood: One (Mostly):White Guy's Encounters With the Native World. McClelland & Stewart. ISBN 0-7710-4278-7.
- Hunter, Robert (2003). Thermageddon: Countdown to 2030. Arcade Publishing. ISBN 1-55970-667-8.
- Hunter, Robert and Robert Keziere (2005). The Greenpeace to Amchitka : An Environmental Odyssey. Arsenal Pulp Press. ISBN 1-55152-178-4.
