= 2015 Sundance Film Festival =

2015 film festival edition

- Festival poster
- Opening film: What Happened, Miss Simone?
- Closing film: Grandma
- Location: Park City, Salt Lake City, Ogden, and Sundance, Utah
- Hosted by: Sundance Institute
- Festival date: January 22 to February 1, 2015
- Language: English
- Website: sundance.org/festival
- 2016 Sundance Film Festival 2014 Sundance Film Festival

The 2015 Sundance Film Festival took place from January 22 to February 1, 2015. What Happened, Miss Simone?, a biographical documentary film about American singer Nina Simone, opened the festival. Comedy-drama film Grandma, directed by Paul Weitz, served as the closing night film.

== Awards ==
The awards ceremony was held on January 30, 2015, at the Basin Recreation Fieldhouse in Park City, Utah. The ceremony was hosted by comedian Tig Notaro.

- U.S. Grand Jury Prize: Documentary – The Wolfpack
- U.S. Grand Jury Prize: Dramatic – Me and Earl and the Dying Girl
- World Cinema Grand Jury Prize: Documentary – The Russian Woodpecker
- World Cinema Grand Jury Prize: Dramatic – Slow West
- Audience Award: U.S. Documentary – Meru
- Audience Award: U.S. Dramatic – Me and Earl and the Dying Girl
- Audience Award: World Cinema Documentary – Dark Horse: The Incredible True Story of Dream Alliance
- Audience Award: World Cinema Dramatic – Umrika
- Audience Award: Best of NEXT – James White
- Directing Award: U.S. Documentary – Cartel Land
- Directing Award: U.S. Dramatic – The Witch
- Directing Award: World Cinema Documentary – Dreamcatcher
- Directing Award: World Cinema Dramatic – The Summer of Sangaile
- Waldo Salt Screenwriting Award: U.S. Dramatic – The Stanford Prison Experiment
- Editing Award: World Cinema Documentary – How to Change the World
- Editing Award: U.S. Dramatic – Dope
- Cinematography Award: U.S. Documentary – Cartel Land
- Cinematography Award: U.S. Dramatic – The Diary of a Teenage Girl
- Cinematography Award: World Cinema Dramatic – Partisan
- World Cinema Dramatic Special Jury Award for Acting – Jack Reynor for Glassland and Regina Casé and Camila Márdila for The Second Mother
- World Cinema Documentary Special Jury Award for Impact – Pervert Park
- World Cinema Documentary Special Jury Award for Unparalleled Access – The Chinese Mayor
- U.S. Documentary Special Jury Award for Social Impact – 3½ Minutes
- U.S. Documentary Special Jury Award for Vérité Filmmaking – Western
- U.S. Dramatic Special Jury Award for Collaborative Vision – Advantageous
- Special Jury Award for Breakout First Feature – (T)ERROR
- Alfred P. Sloan Feature Film Prize – The Stanford Prison Experiment

Additional awards were presented at separate ceremonies. The Shorts Awards were presented January 28, 2015 at the ceremony in Park City, Utah.

- Short Film Grand Jury Prize – World of Tomorrow
- Short Film Jury Award: U.S. Fiction – SMILF
- Short Film Jury Award: International Fiction – Oh Lucy!
- Short Film Jury Award: Non-fiction – The Face of Ukraine: Casting Oksana Baiul
- Short Film Jury Award: Animation – Storm hits jacket
- Short Film Special Jury Award for Acting – Back Alley
- Short Film Special Jury Award for Visual Poetry – Object
- Sundance Institute/Mahindra Global Filmmaking Awards – Haifaa al-Mansour for Be Safe I Love You, K'naan for The Poet, Myroslav Slaboshpytskiy for Luxembourg, Oskar Sulowski for Rosebuds.
- Sundance Institute/NHK Filmmaker Award – Laure de Clermont-Tonnerre for Mustang.
- 2015 Red Crown Producer's Award – Stephanie Langhoff for The Bronze.

== Juries ==
Jury members, for each program of the festival, including the Alfred P. Sloan Jury, which also took part in the Science in Film Forum Panel, were announced on December 18, 2014. Presenters of awards are followed by asterisks:

U.S. Documentary Jury

- Eugene Hernandez*
- Kirsten Johnson*
- Michele Norris*
- Gordon Quinn*
- Roger Ross Williams*

U.S. Dramatic Jury

- Lance Acord*
- Sarah Flack*
- Cary Fukunaga*
- Winona Ryder*
- Edgar Wright*

World Documentary Jury

- Elena Fortes Acosta*
- Mark Cousins*
- Ingrid Kopp*

World Dramatic Jury

- Mia Hansen-Løve*
- Col Needham*
- Taika Waititi*

Alfred P. Sloan Jury

- Paula S. Apsell
- Janna Levin
- Brit Marling
- Jonathan Nolan
- Adam Steltzner

Short Film Jury

- K. K. Barrett
- Alia Shawkat
- Autumn de Wilde

Others who presented awards included Adam Scott, Kevin Pollak, Kevin Corrigan, Patrick Fugit and Trevor Groth.

== Films ==
For a full list of films appeared at the festival, see List of films at the 2015 Sundance Film Festival.

== Festival theaters ==
The number of seats available at the festival theaters, where films were shown is listed below:

Park City

- Eccles Theatre – 1,270 seats
- Egyptian Theatre – 282 seats
- Holiday Village Cinema 4 – 162 seats
- Library Center Theatre – 486 seats
- The MARC Theatre – 550 seats
- Prospector Square Theatre – 324 seats
- Redstone Cinema 1 – 188 seats
- Redstone Cinema 2 – 175 seats
- Redstone Cinema 7 – 176 seats
- Temple Theatre – 840 seats
- Yarrow Hotel Theatre – 295 seats

Salt Lake City

- Broadway Cinema 3 – 243 seats
- Broadway Cinema 6 – 245 seats
- Rose Wagner Performing Arts Center – 495 seats
- SLC Library – 300 seats
- Tower Theatre – 349 seats
- The Grand Theatre – 1,100 seats

Sundance Resort

- Sundance Resort Screening Room – 164 seats

Ogden

- Peery's Egyptian Theatre – 840 seats

== Acquisitions ==
Acquisitions at the festival included the following:

- A24
  - The End of the Tour
  - The Witch
  - Mississippi Grind
- Alchemy
  - Strangerland
  - Zipper
- Bleecker Street
  - I'll See You In My Dreams
- Broad Green
  - A Walk in the Woods
- Discover Channel
  - Racing Extinction
- Film Arcade
  - Unexpected
- Focus
  - Cop Car
- Fortissimo
  - Songs My Brothers Taught Me
- Fox Searchlight
  - Mistress America
  - Me, Earl And The Dying Girl
  - Brooklyn
- Gravitas Ventures
  - Being Evel
- HBO
  - 3 1/2 Minutes
- IFC Films
  - The D Train
  - Sleeping with Other People
- IFC Midnight
  - Reversal
  - The Hallow
- Kino Lorber
  - The Forbidden Room
- Lionsgate
  - Don Verdean
  - Knock Knock
- Magnolia
  - Results
  - Tangerine
  - Best of Enemies
  - The Wolfpack
- Netflix
  - Hot Girls Wanted
- Open Road
  - Dope
- Orchard
  - The Overnight
  - Digging for Fire
  - Finders Keepers
  - Cartel Land
- Oscilloscope
  - The Second Mother
- Relativity Sports
  - In Football We Trust
- Samuel Goldwyn Films
  - Fresh Dressed
  - Lila & Eve
- Screen Media Films
  - Ten Thousand Saints
- Showtime
  - Dreamcatcher
- Sony Pictures Classics
  - The Diary of a Teenage Girl
  - Grandma
  - Dark Horse
- Sundance Selects
  - City of Gold
- Tribeca Film
  - Misery Loves Comedy
- Relativity
  - The Bronze
