= State of Georgia v. Allison =

2002 U.S. court case

State of Georgia vs. Allison
- Decided: 2002

Case history
- Subsequent action: Various

State of Georgia v. Allison was a Georgia court case. In Georgia vs Allison, Janet Allison was convicted of sexual offenses for allowing her (then pregnant) daughter, aged 15, to have sexual intercourse in her home. The events took place in the year 2000. The young couple later married and had a child of their own, but Allison's name has been entered into the sex offender registry, with various adverse consequences for her life and that of her family.

As a family law matter, the case was not widely reported in the popular press at the time, but Allison's plight has subsequently attracted attention from publications and television programmes critical of the State of Georgia's stance on sex offenders.

Allison was not given a prison term, but three of her children were taken into foster care. She was obliged to leave her four bedroom home, because it is unlawful for a sex offender to live within a quarter of a mile of a church, and now lives in a mobile home "way off down a dirt road". She is allowed no contact with the daughter involved, nor with her grandchild. Further changes to Georgia's laws on sex offenders in 2006 strengthened the restrictions on where Allison could live.

When Georgia's strict sex offender residency law passed the state legislature in 2006, the bill's House sponsor, Jerry Keen, said Georgians should celebrate because sex offenders would be forced to leave Georgia. Keen stated: "We want people running away from Georgia. Given the toughest laws here, we think a lot of people could move to another state ... If it becomes too onerous and too inconvenient, they just may want to live somewhere else. And I don't care where, as long as it's not in Georgia."

Allison was one of the plaintiffs who challenged the new provision of the sex offender law. According to the Newstandard News, Allison "has already been informed by county sheriffs that she must move, and, according to the complaint, she has unsuccessfully searched in five counties for an affordable home that would allow her to comply with the new law."

The Southern Center for Human Rights called this outcome unconstitutional and has challenged it in the Federal courts.

On July 20, 2010, the Georgia legislature amended the law, relaxing some of the restrictions on some sex offenders. According to Associated Press writer Greg Bluestein the relaxed restrictions included an appeal procedure, whereby those on the sex offender list could explain why they thought they should be removed. The restrictions on whether, and how close to schools and churches those on the list could live was also relaxed. Bluestein wrote "After losing court battle after court battle, state legislators were forced to make a change or a federal judge was going to throw out the entire law." As someone convicted before 2003, Allison no longer faces a residency restriction.

== See also ==
- Echols County, Georgia - County to which several Georgia criminals, and not only sex offenders, are sometimes exiled as a condition of probation.
- Julia Tuttle Causeway sex offender colony - Encampment of sex offenders formed because of even stricter residency laws in Miami, Florida.
