= Florida Civil Commitment Center =

Treatment center for sex offenders

Coordinates: 27°12′13″N 81°39′23″W

The Florida Civil Commitment Center, located at 13619 Highway 70, Arcadia, Florida, is a mental health/correctional facility which houses sex offenders civilly committed. The site is that of the former DeSoto Correctional Work Camp, adjacent to the DeSoto Correctional Institution. It is operated by Wellpath Recovery Solutions, a private company, under a $272 million (2015) contract with the Florida Department of Children and Families. The CCC was previously operated by Liberty Behavioral Health. An inmate uprising in 2005 led to an incident in which 450 correctional officers, dressed in riot gear and using pepper spray, stormed into the facility to take control of the 463 residents the facility held at that time.

The current facility, with 720 beds, opened in 2009. According to its Web page, it provides treatment for "sexually violent predators...until such time as a resident’s mental illness or personality disorder has so changed that a court determines it is safe for the person to be at large. Correct Care also houses detainees awaiting their civil commitment trial." It is accredited by the Commission on Accreditation of Rehabilitation Facilities. 2013-14 and 2014-15 reports from the Department of Children and Families indicate that in 2014-15 there were "more than 20" unfilled treatment/mental health positions, and "dozens" of vacant security officer positions. However, "state authorities" said in 2015 that Correct Care "is under a corrective action plan for staffing issues and is doing a good job overall with a difficult population."

Florida is the only state whose civil commitment facility is operated by a profit-making company. Florida has more people civilly committed than any other state, just as Florida has a disproportionally large share – 8% – of the nation's sex offenders.

Under the Jimmy Ryce Act, since 1999 inmates "with sex offense histories" due to be released from a Florida prison are reviewed by the Florida Department of Corrections, the Florida Department of Children and Families, and state attorneys to assess the level of risk for re-offense. This includes those who have completed a sentence for a sex crime in another state, but are incarcerated in Florida for a non-sexual offense.

Those who are found likely to reoffend are sent to the Florida Civil Commitment Center to await a commitment trial before a judge or jury. The waits for these trials can be "excruciatingly long." In April 2014, 72 of the 650 residents were awaiting a commitment trial. Before the commitment trial, no treatment is provided.

As of 2015, 55,000 offenders had been referred to the program. Prosecutors filed Petitions for Involuntary Civil Commitment for 1,577, who were then moved to FCCC. Of those, 932 were committed.

The delays in commitment trials, which are what determine whether the person remains at FCCC or is released, have been the subject of public criticism. Florida's 2nd District Court of Appeals, in response to a suit by a man whose status was undecided after eight years, said "these proceedings often seem to take many years"; the Florida Supreme Court, reviewing the case, stated that the delays "present serious questions as to the functioning of our system for civil commitments." The delays are increasing. Another resident waited 4 1/2 years for a commitment trial, adding "I saw guys that were in there eight, nine, 10 years and never saw the inside of a courtroom. And if the state has their way about it, they won't." If the result of the commitment trial is that the person in question remains a danger, the commitment is indefinite. Once a year, they can appeal for release.

No support is available from any government agency for those released. One resident being released asked where he should go, and said he was told, "Go buy a tent and live in the woods with the rest of the sex offenders." Miracle Village, a private charity, does provide a limited amount of housing and other support.

In November 2024, Wellpath filed for Chapter 11 bankruptcy after being unable to meet debt commitments, as well as high rising and labor costs. The company listed assets and liabilities between $1 billion and $10 billion.
