= Station to Station (2015 film) =

2015 American experimental film

- Film poster
- Directed by: Doug Aitken
- Produced by: Chris Totushek, Alex Waite
- Cinematography: Doug Aitken, Corey Walter
- Edited by: Austin Meredith
- Release date: January 25, 2015 (Sundance Film Festival)
- Country: United States
- Language: English

Station to Station is the 2015 experimental film of Doug Aitken's 2013 "Nomadic Happening", the film is made up of 62 one-minute films. It was distributed internationally to more than a half dozen international markets in 2015 following its release at the Sundance Film Festival. The film has been included on a list of the best 20 films to be set on trains.

The Hollywood Reporter described the project in an article as: "Artist-director Doug Aitken directed the semi-experimental Station to Station... the feature, 71 minutes in total including the opening and end credits, was shot over the course of 24 days in 2013, when a train with Aitken’s “kinetic light sculpture,” fixed to the train’s outer shell, traveled from New York to San Francisco. Aboard the vehicle and along the way, at 10 different stops, art happenings with participants from media ranging from music and photography to dance and the visual arts were organized....They all find their way into the film organically, which thus becomes a meditation on art, (train) travel and transience. an artwork that looks at other art — a concept film about a conceptual art project. It suggests that a one-minute part can be the whole for one viewer or that, conversely, the whole is made up of an infinite amount of smaller parts that can each tell only a small part of the story."

The filmmakers traveled 4,000 miles by train from the Atlantic Ocean to the Pacific, filming various groups of musicians, artists and performers. Participants in the project and the film included Patti Smith, Urs Fischer, Cat Power, Beck, Ed Ruscha, Mark Bradford, Thomas Demand, Eleanor Friedberger, No Age, Kenneth Anger, Ernesto Neto, Charlotte Gainsbourg, Dan Deacon, Dirty Projectors, Nite Jewel, Savages, Twin Shadow, Connan Mocaksin, Olaf Breuning, Peter Coffin, Meschac Gaba, Liz Glynn, Carsten Höller, Christian Jankowski, Aaron Koblin, Jack Pierson, Stephen Shore, Rikrit Tiravanija, Lawrence Weiner, and Alice Waters.
