= Paul Watson =

Canadian environmental activist (born 1950)

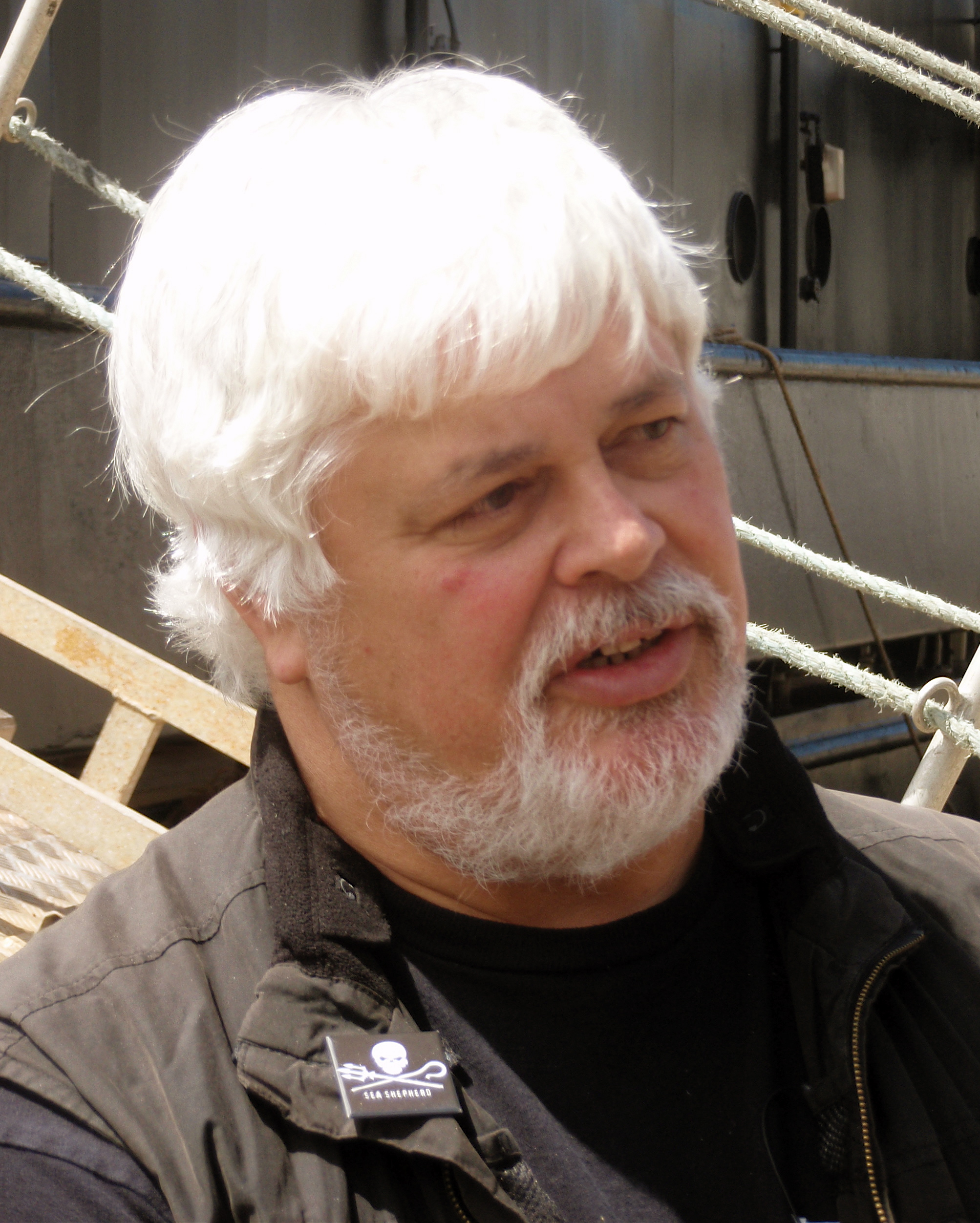
- Watson, with the MY Steve Irwin docked in Hobart, in 2009
- Born: Paul Franklin Watson; December 2, 1950 (age 75); Toronto, Ontario, Canada
- Citizenship: Canadian; American
- Occupations: Activist; television personality
- Known for: Environmental, conservational and animal rights activism
- Spouses: Starlet Lum; Lisa DiStefano; Allison Lance (div. c. 2008); Yana Rusinovich (m. 2015)
- Children: 3

Paul Franklin Watson (born December 2, 1950) is a Canadian-American environmental, conservation and animal rights activist, who founded the Sea Shepherd Conservation Society and Captain Paul Watson Foundation (CPWF), two anti-poaching and direct action groups focused on marine conservation activism. The tactics used by Sea Shepherd have attracted opposition, with the group accused of eco-terrorism by both the Japanese government and Greenpeace. Watson is a citizen of Canada and the United States.

Watson, a native of Toronto, has been an environmental activist since his teens. He joined a Sierra Club protest against nuclear testing in 1969 and crewed on board the Greenpeace Too in November 1971, to oppose nuclear testing at Amchitka Island in the Aleutians. In 1972, he was a co-founder of Greenpeace. Because Watson argued for a strategy of direct action that conflicted with the Greenpeace interpretation of nonviolence, he was ousted from the board in 1977. Greenpeace has since stated that Watson was an influential early member, but not one of the founders of Greenpeace. Watson states that Greenpeace has revised their history but Jerry Rothwells documentary How to Change the World firmly established Watson as the 8th founding member of Greenpeace, with the lifetime membership number of 007 with Robert Hunter being 000. The same year, he formed the Sea Shepherd Conservation Society. The group was the subject of a reality show named Whale Wars.

Watson promotes aggressive non-violent intervention to defend marine life and marine eco-systems. He also promotes Biocentrism.

Watson's activities have led to legal action from authorities in countries including the United States, Canada, Norway, Costa Rica and Japan. He was detained in Germany on an extradition request by Costa Rica in May 2012. An Interpol red notice was issued on September 14, 2012, at the request of Japan and Costa Rica. Watson has never been convicted of a criminal felony despite numerous arrests during his career.

After staying at sea for 15 months following his escape from Germany, where he was released on bail, he returned to Los Angeles in late October 2013, going through customs and "was not arrested". He appeared before a US appeals court on November 6, 2013, stating that neither he nor the Sea Shepherd Conservation Society violated a 2012 order requiring them to leave whaling vessels alone. Although the United States is a signatory member of Interpol, Watson has not been detained for extradition to Japan or Costa Rica.

In March 2019, Costa Rica dropped all charges against Watson and has removed the Interpol red notice. The Interpol red notice was fully removed against Watson in July of 2025.

Watson has created his own foundation, the Captain Paul Watson Foundation (CPWF), after resigning from the Sea Shepherd Conservation Society and being subsequently removed from the board of Sea Shepherd Global. He has also left the executive office of Sea Shepherd's Australian branch.

In July 2024, Watson was detained in Nuuk in Greenland by the Danish police, citing an Interpol red notice from Japan. He was expected to stay in pre-trial detention until October 2, 2024; Watson and the Captain Paul Watson Foundation filed an appeal with the Supreme Court to have the decision set aside. After his detention was extended several times, on December 17, 2024, the Danish government decided that Watson would not be extradited to Japan. He was released from prison and returned to France.

== Early and personal life ==
Paul Watson was born in Toronto, the oldest child of Anthony Joseph Watson and Annamarie Larsen, and grew up in St. Andrews, New Brunswick, along with three younger sisters and three younger brothers. As a child he was a member of the Kindness Club, which he has credited with teaching him to "respect and defend animals". After working as a tour guide at Expo 67, the World's Fair that took place in Montreal in 1967, Watson rode the rails to Vancouver.

In 1968 and the early 1970s, he joined the Canadian Coast Guard, where he served aboard weatherships, search and rescue hovercraft, and buoy tenders. He signed up as a merchant seaman in 1969 with the Norwegian Consulate in Vancouver and shipped out on the 30,000 ton bulk carrier Bris as a deckhand. The Bris was registered in Oslo, Norway, and manifested for the Indian Ocean and Pacific trade. In 1972 he shipped out of San Francisco on the 35,000 ton bulk Swedish carrier Jarl R. Trapp and manifested for the Indian Ocean and Pacific trade.

Watson has one daughter, Lilliolani (born 1980), with his first wife, Starlet Lum, who was a founding director of Greenpeace Quebec, Earthforce!, Project Wolf, and Sea Shepherd. His second wife, Lisa Distefano, was Sea Shepherd's Director of Operations during the Makah anti-whaling campaigns in Friday Harbor. His third wife, Allison Lance, is an animal rights activist and a volunteer crew member of Sea Shepherd. Watson has two grandchildren. Watson married his fourth wife Yana Rusinovich on February 14, 2015, in Paris. Watson and Rusinovich have two sons, Tiger and Murtagh.

Watson ran for Parliament in Vancouver Centre twice for the Green Party. In 1995, he ran for Mayor of Vancouver for the Green Party.

Watson is living in Paris, writing books, giving lectures and coordinating marine conservation campaigns, currently focusing on opposition to illegal whaling operations and opposition to deep sea mining.

== Career ==
=== Early years ===
In October 1969, Watson joined a Sierra Club protest against nuclear testing at Amchitka Island. The group which formed as a result of that protest was the Don't Make a Wave Committee, which evolved into the group known today as Greenpeace. In the early 1970s, Watson was also active with SDU (Students for a Democratic University). Watson sailed as a crew member aboard the Greenpeace Too! ship in 1971 and skippered the Greenpeace boat Astral in 1972. Paul Watson continued as a crew member, skipper, and officer aboard several Greenpeace voyages throughout the mid-1970s.

According to The New Yorker, The New York Times, and other sources, Watson was a founding member of Greenpeace, but the organization denies this stating he "was an influential early member but not, as he sometimes claims, a founder." Watson joined Greenpeace on its Amchitka expedition, The Amchitka voyage was one campaign with two ships, the Greenpeace and the Greenpeace Too. Together it was one expedition with the Greenpeace voyage in October and relieved by the Greenpeace Too in November.

=== Sea Shepherd Conservation Society ===
The first Sea Shepherd vessel, the Sea Shepherd, was purchased in December 1978 with assistance from the Fund for Animals and the Royal Society for the Prevention of Cruelty to Animals. Sea Shepherd soon established itself as one of the more controversial environmental groups, known for provocative direct action tactics. These tactics have included throwing objects onto the decks of whaling ships, the use of "prop foulers" in an attempt to sabotage the ships, boarding whaling vessels, and the scuttling of two ships in an Icelandic harbor. In January 2013, Watson relinquished captaincy of the Steve Irwin. The organization and its activities to halt whaling are the focus of a reality TV series, Whale Wars, airing on Animal Planet.

Watson was forcibly removed as head of the Sea Shepherd Conservation Society in September 2022, after the board of directors voted him out in place of new government deals and promises of reduced conflict and a disengagement of direct obstruction to illegal fishing and whaling vessels. Many branches of Sea Shepherd worldwide followed Paul Watson and dissolved their campaigns in light of a new chapter suitably named, Captain Paul Watson Foundation. Captain Paul Watson is no longer legally allowed to be seen or photographed with the Sea Shepherd name or logo and has completely dropped all ties to the brand.

=== Other environmental activities ===
Watson was a field correspondent for Defenders of Wildlife from 1976 to 1980 and a field representative for the Fund for Animals from 1978 to 1981. Watson also was a co-founder of Friends of the Wolf and Earthforce Environmental Society.

During the 1980s, Watson declared his support for Earth First! and cultivated friendships with David Foreman and Edward Abbey. He proclaimed Sea Shepherd to be the "navy" of Earth First! According to The New Yorker, Watson revived the 19th-century practice of tree spiking.

Watson worked with the Green Party of British Columbia in Vancouver in the 1980s and 90s. He ran for mayor in 1996, placing fourth.

In April 2003, Watson was elected to the board of directors of the Sierra Club for a three-year term. In 2006, he did not seek re-election. He resigned from the board a month before his term ended, in protest against the organization's sponsorship of a "Why I Hunt" essay contest.

In January 2008, Paul Watson was named by The Guardian as one of its "50 people who could save the planet" for the work of the Sea Shepherd Conservation Society.

=== Writings on activism ===
Watson published Earthforce!, a guide to strategy for environmental activists in 1993. In it, he specifically endorsed the tactics of "monkeywrenching" previously described by Dave Foreman and Edward Abbey. According to Foreman in Eco-Defense—The Field Guide to Monkey-Wrenching— these are tactics of sabotage, covert activity, and direct action. Watson says he incorporated his own personal experience in writing the book.

In Earthforce! An Earth Warrior's Guide to Strategy, Watson expressed disdain for the truthfulness of mainstream media:

The nature of the mass media today is such that the truth is irrelevant. What is true and what is right to the general public is what is defined as true and right by the mass media. Ronald Reagan understood that the facts are not relevant. The media reported what he said as fact. Follow-up investigation was "old news." A headline comment on Monday's newspaper far outweighs the revelation of inaccuracy revealed in a small box inside the paper on Tuesday or Wednesday.

Watson was explicit about what he perceived to be the lack of truthfulness in mass media: "If you do not know an answer, a fact, or a statistic, then simply follow the example of an American President and do as Ronald Reagan did—make it up on the spot and deliver the information confidently and without hesitation." In a subsequent book, Ocean Warrior, Watson expanded on this view, saying: "Survival in a media culture meant developing the skills to understand and manipulate media to achieve strategic objectives."

In 2007 Watson explained his view of needed population control and the future for humans given their role in the Holocene extinction, which he refers to as the "Holocenic hominid collective suicide event":

Today, escalating human populations have vastly exceeded global carrying capacity and now produce massive quantities of solid, liquid, and gaseous waste [...] No human community should be larger than 20,000 people and separated from other communities by wilderness areas [...] We need to radically and intelligently reduce human populations to fewer than one billion [...] Curing a body of cancer requires radical and invasive therapy, and therefore, curing the biosphere of the human virus will also require a radical and invasive approach [...] Who should have children? Those who are responsible and completely dedicated to the responsibility which is actually a very small percentage of humans.

=== Separation from Greenpeace ===
Paul Watson continued as a crew member, officer, and skipper (in 1972) aboard several Greenpeace voyages throughout the mid-1970s. He considers himself a founding member of Greenpeace and Greenpeace International, a claim Greenpeace disputes despite it being pointed out in the documentary How to Change the World which shows that Watson was indeed one of the original founding members of Greenpeace. Watson has since accused Greenpeace of rewriting their history.

In 1977, Watson was expelled from the Greenpeace's board of directors by a vote of 11 to 1 (Watson himself cast the single vote against it). The group felt his strong, "front and center" personality and frequently voiced opposition to Greenpeace's interpretation of "nonviolence" were too divisive. Watson subsequently left the group. The group has since labeled his actions at the time as those of a "mutineer" within their ranks. That same year, he founded his own group, the Sea Shepherd Conservation Society.

During an interview in 1978 with CBC Radio, Watson spoke out against Greenpeace (as well as other organizations) and their role and motives for the anti-sealing campaigns. Watson accused these organizations of campaigning against the Canadian seal hunt because it is an easy way to raise money and it is a profit maker for the organizations. He said that Greenpeace had leveraged the image of harp seals, who appeared to be crying due to the lubrication that protects their eyes from salt water, for fundraising efforts although harp seals were not endangered. The Sea Shepherd Conservation Society, which he founded, used the same tactics.

Greenpeace has called Watson a violent extremist and will no longer comment on his activities.

=== Charges and prosecutions ===
Watson was sentenced to 10 days in prison and fined $8,000 for his actions during a Canadian seal hunt protest in 1980, after being convicted of assaulting a fisheries officer. Watson served his sentence at Her Majesty's Penitentiary, St. John's, Newfoundland and Labrador. He was also found guilty under the Seal Protection Act for painting harp seal pups with red dye to devalue their pelts. Watson was arrested in 1993 in Canada on charges stemming from actions against Cuban and Spanish fishing boats off the coast of Newfoundland. In 1997, Watson was convicted in absentia and sentenced to serve 120 days in jail by a court in Lofoten, Norway, on charges of attempting to sink the small scale Norwegian fishing and whaling vessel Nybrænna on December 26, 1992. Dutch authorities refused to hand him over to Norwegian authorities although he did spend 80 days in detention in the Netherlands pending a ruling on extradition before being released.

There have not been any successful attempts at prosecuting Watson for his activities with Sea Shepherd since the trial in Newfoundland. Watson defends his actions as falling within international law, in particular Sea Shepherd's right to enforce maritime regulations against illegal whalers and sealers.

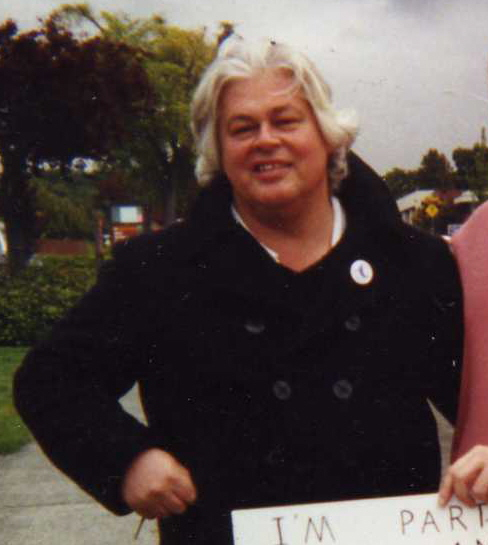
Paul Watson leads protest against Makah whaling, Port Angeles, Washington, 1998.

Watson took responsibility for the operation, abiding by published Sea Shepherd principles.[65] He went to Iceland saying, "I am responsible for all activities undertaken in the name of Sea Shepherd Conservation Society. I give the orders."[66] He was deported without being charged and is considered a persona non grata by Iceland.[67][68]

In April 2010 the Japanese Coast Guard obtained an arrest warrant for Watson "...on suspicion of ordering sabotage activities against Japan's whaling fleet", and Interpol has listed him as wanted at the request of Japan. The red notice has the charges issued by Japan as, "Breaking into the Vessel, Damage to Property, Forcible Obstruction of Business, Injury". In March 2012 Interpol issued a "written statement to all 190 member countries making it clear that it would not publish a Red Notice" for the detention of Watson, but reversed that position in September 2012. In both statements Interpol stated that a "Red Notice is not an international arrest warrant" that it is "a request for any country to identify or locate an individual with a view to their provisional arrest and extradition in accordance with the country's national laws".

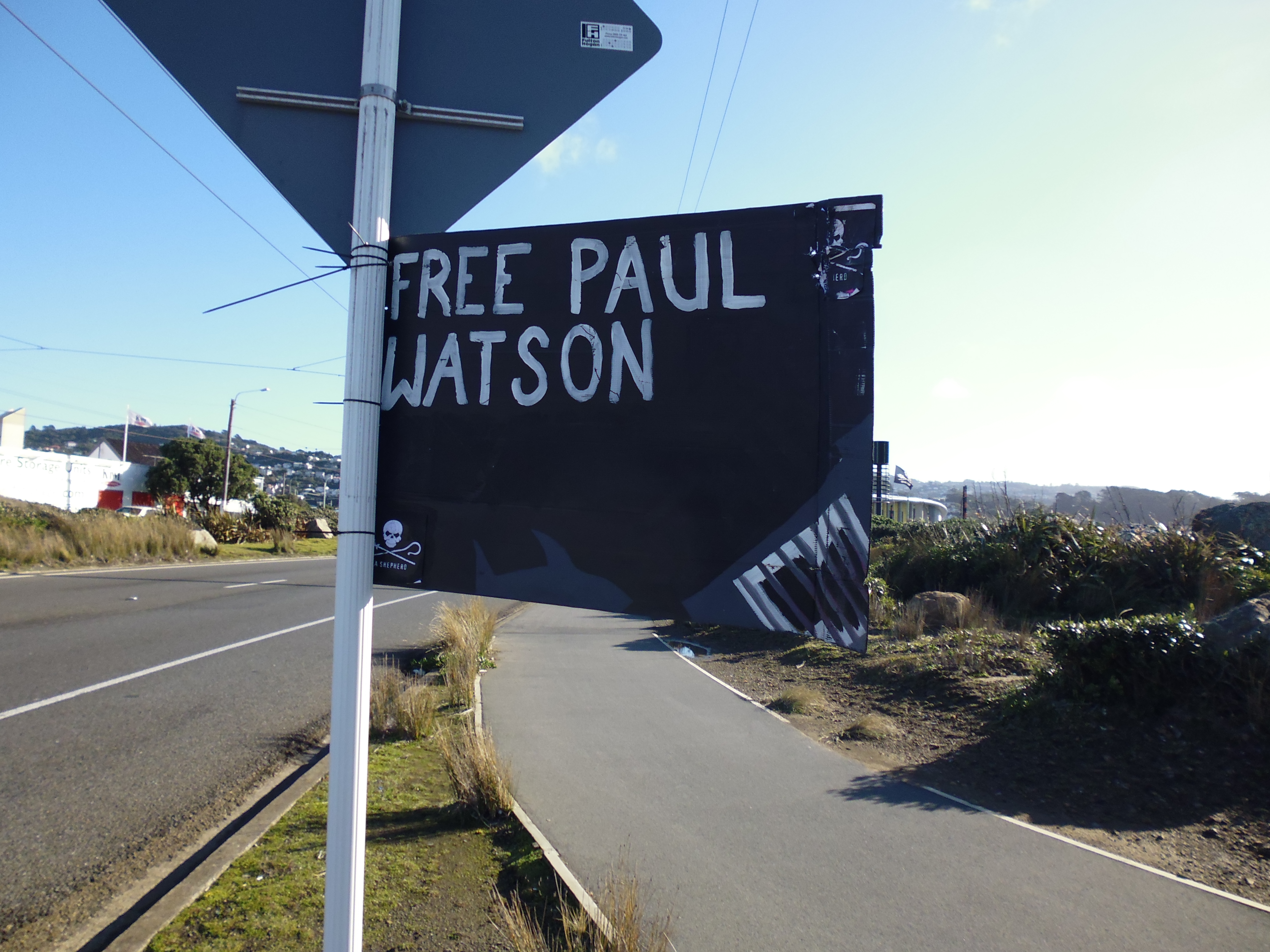
A sign calling for the dropping of charges against Watson

In May 2012 Watson was detained by German authorities at Frankfurt Airport because of a request from the government of Costa Rica. The charge stemmed from an altercation at sea in 2002 in which Sea Shepherd said that the other vessel was illegally shark finning in Guatemalan waters. Crew members of the other ship accused Sea Shepherd of trying to kill them. Watson was charged with violating navigational regulations with the Interpol alert stating the charge as peligro de naufragio ("danger of shipwreck"). The conflict took place during filming for the documentary Sharkwater and the charges were dropped by prosecutors after video of the incident made by the documentary film makers was shown. On May 21, Watson was released on bail of €250,000 but required to report to police in Frankfurt on a daily basis. In June, Costa Rica formally requested Watson's extradition from Germany. On July 19, 2012, Japan applied for an extradition order and Watson left Germany, resulting in a German court ordering his immediate re-arrest. It is understood the statute of limitations on his Costa Rican charges was set to expire in June 2013. On August 7, 2012, Interpol renewed the Red Notice for Watson on the charges of "causing a danger of drowning or of an air disaster" laid by Costa Rica. It was reported that Watson would come out of hiding to join Sea Shepherd in the 2012–13 campaign against Japanese whaling. Watson rejoined the crew of the Steve Irwin in the South Pacific in late November 2012. In March 2019, Costa Rica dropped all charges against Watson and has removed the Interpol red notice.

On July 21, 2024, Watson was arrested in Greenland—an autonomous territory of Denmark—by Danish authorities due to the red notice issued by Japan against him in 2012. His arrest was announced by the Neptune's Pirates. The organization criticizes this decision, arguing that "after having been posted online for years, the notice had recently disappeared from the Interpol website, leading Paul Watson and his lawyers to believe that he was now free of his movements”. On October 2, the Nuuk court ordered Paul Watson to remain in custody until October 23, in order to ensure his presence in the context of the extradition decision by the Danish courts. Subsequently, another extension of his detention was issued by the court on October 23, stating that he would be detained until November 13, 2024. This was followed on November 13 by another extension which set the next hearing date as December 2, 2024. On December 2, it was announced that a decision on whether not Watson will be extradited to Japan will be taken by December 18, 2024.

In October 2024, while imprisoned in Greenland, Watson sent a letter to French President Emmanuel Macron requesting political asylum. While Macron has previously expressed his support for Watson and had intervened with the Danish authorities on his behalf after his arrest, there has been no public comment from Macron's office to Watson's letter. Before his imprisonment, Watson was living in France with his wife and two young children.

In December 2024, the Ministry of Justice of Denmark denied Japan's request to extradite Watson and as a result he was released from prison. His release was confirmed by his lawyer Julie Stage, who remarked that the charges against him were "groundless".

On July 22, 2025, Interpol announced it formally removed the Red Notice against Watson. This occurred after Interpol's Commission for the Control of Interpol's Files (CCF) conducted an internal review on Watson's case. The Commission determined the charges against Watson were "disproportionate" compared to his actual actions and found evidence of "political elements" and previous interference in the case by the Government of Japan. Thus resulting in the Red Notice's termination.

=== Sierra Club immigration stance ===
In 1999, Watson ran unsuccessfully for election to the national Sierra Club Board of Directors, with the backing of the anti-immigration faction Sierrans for US Population Stabilization (SUSPS). After his election to the board in 2003, Watson supported an unsuccessful slate of candidates supporting strict immigration controls as an element of a population stabilization policy. This effort was denounced by another candidate in the election, Morris Dees of the Southern Poverty Law Center, as a "hostile takeover" attempt by "radical anti-immigrant activists." Watson responded by saying that the only change he was seeking in the organization's immigration stance was to restore the position it had held before its 1996 "neutrality policy." Watson left the Sierra Club board in 2006.

=== Anti-sealing activities ===
In April 2008, Watson stated that, while the deaths of three Canadian seal hunters (a fourth one is still missing) in a marine accident involving a Canadian Coast Guard vessel and a fishing boat during the 2008 Canadian Commercial Seal Hunt were a tragedy, he felt that the slaughter of hundreds of thousands of seals is an even greater tragedy. Canadian Federal Fisheries Minister Loyola Hearn accused Watson of trivializing the memory of the lost sealers. Watson replied that Hearn was trying to distract attention from his government's incompetence as the boat the men were on capsized while under tow by a Canadian Coast Guard vessel, while his political ambitions continued to support and subsidize an industry that had no place in the 21st century. In 1978, Watson expressed opposition to seal hunt protest organization, suggesting in an interview with CBC's Barbara Frum that saving seals is a cheap and easy fundraiser and that seals do not deserve special status over other species. Newfoundland and Labrador Premier Danny Williams was quoted as saying, "I think what a lot of people don't realize is that this man is a terrorist."

=== Australian visa issues ===
In October 2009, Watson, who carries a US passport, complained to media outlets about having his request for an Australian visa denied. He states that the Australian government was attempting to sabotage the upcoming 2010 Sea Shepherd campaign by denying him entry into the country. Watson and several other shipmates were also unable to join the Steve Irwin on its promotional tour of Australia until they were able to provide documentation from the governments of the United States, Canada and Norway, exonerating them from previously claimed acts of violence, specifically claims by Sea Shepherd of intentionally sinking a ship in Norway. In January 2013, Paul Watson was presented with an Aboriginal passport (classified as a fantasy passport and not recognised by the Australian government) by the Krautungalung people of the Gunnai Nation.

=== Alleged shooting ===
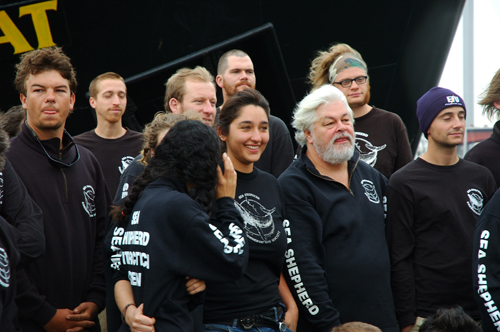
Paul Watson and the Farley Mowat crew in 2005

On March 17, 2008, Watson said that he was shot by the Japanese crew or coast guard personnel during the Operation Migaloo anti-whaling campaign in the Southern Ocean. The incident is documented during the season finale of season 1 of the Whale Wars TV reality show, and the first six episodes are covered as a buildup to what is portrayed as the major incident during the campaign. The Japanese respond by throwing stun grenades, one crew member is injured from a grenade detonating close behind him and another injured trying to escape the explosions. Watson is then shown reaching inside his jacket and body armour and remarking "I've been hit." Back inside the bridge of the Steve Irwin, a metal fragment is found inside the vest.

The Japanese Institute of Cetacean Research disputes Sea Shepherd's statements. The Institute and Coast Guard said that they used seven stun grenades designed to temporarily debilitate a target by rendering them blind and deaf for a period of time. The Japanese government also alleged that the whalers launched "noise balls", described as "loud explosive deterrent devices". Neither of the two conflicting accounts have been independently verified. The Australian Foreign Affairs Department had condemned "actions by crew members of any vessel that cause injury". Two media releases were made on the same day from the office. One said that the Australian Embassy in Tokyo had been informed by the Japanese that the whalers had "fired warning shots" while the updated version used the phrase "'warning balls' – also known as 'flashbangs' – had been fired".

=== Accusations of terrorism ===
Watson has been called an eco-terrorist by the Japanese government for his direct action tactics against whalers, and it repeated its position after conflicts during the 2009–10 whaling season.

At an animal rights convention in 2002, Paul Watson was also quoted as saying, "There's nothing wrong with being a terrorist, as long as you win. Then you write the history". In 2010, Fox News commentator Glenn Beck also discussed the comment, criticizing Watson's views. Watson responded to Beck's comments on the official Sea Shepherd website by stating that he had said that but that it was taken out of context, paraphrasing Gerald Seymour's "One man's terrorist is another's freedom fighter".

=== Comments following 2011 Tohoku earthquake and tsunami ===
Watson was criticized for his poem published immediately following the 2011 Tōhoku earthquake and tsunami which suggested the disaster was Neptune's anger. Watson responded to critics with a commentary on the Sea Shepherd website expressing "deepest concern and sympathy for the people of Japan who are suffering through one of the worst natural disasters in the history of civilization".

=== Criticism of New Zealand ===
In 2013, three Sea Shepherd Conservation Society ships docked in New Zealand and were searched by New Zealand authorities to see if Watson was aboard. He was not, having transferred to another ship in international waters, aware New Zealand was required to notify Interpol if he entered the country. Watson criticised the search, accusing New Zealand of siding with Japan on the issue of whaling in the Southern Ocean.

=== Split from Sea Shepherd ===
On July 27, 2022, Watson formally announced on a social media statement that he was leaving the Sea Shepherd Conservation Society (SSCS) and setting up a new organization, the Captain Paul Watson Foundation (CPWF). This was due to what Watson considered an abandonment of Sea Shepherd's mission and values by the current board of directors at SSCS.

Subsequently, on September 3, 2022, he was removed from the board of Sea Shepherd Global in a 4 to 2 vote. Watson himself was not present during, nor even invited to partake in, the vote. Regarding the choice to name the CPWF after himself, Watson stated that "the reason I called it that is because it's pretty hard for anyone to infiltrate and take over an organization that included my name".

In December 2022 the CPWF announced it had acquired their first ship, the former Scottish Fisheries Protection Agency patrol vessel Vigilant. The Vigilant would be promptly renamed the MV John Paul DeJoria. The vessel being named after both prominent CPWF ambassador and philanthropist John Paul DeJoria and a previous Sea Shepherd vessel scrapped in 2022 by Ocean Express Recycling, the MV John Paul DeJoria.

==== Captain Paul Watson Foundation Fleet ====
Past vessels
Vessel name	Years in use under the Paul Watson Foundation	Country of Origin	Fate
MV John Paul DeJoria	(2017–2022)	United States	Scrapped in Mexico by Ocean Express Recycling
Ghost	(2022–?)	Great Britain	Retired

Fleet as of 2026
Vessel name	Years in service	Country of Origin	Current Condition
John Paul DeJoria II	2023	United Kingdom	Active
Bandero	2024	Japan	Seized by Icelandic Coast Guard and Viking Squad
Martin Sheen	2025	United States	Active
Spectre	2022	Great Britain	Active
LCVP Selkie	2022	Great Britain	Active
JPD Rigid Inflatable Boat (RIB)	2023	Great Britain	Active
Siren	2014	Unknown	Seized by Icelandic Coast Guard and Viking Squad
Shadow	2022	Great Britain	Active
Lionheart	2022	Great Britain	Active
Dylan	2025	Australia	Active
Ryan	2025	Australia	Active
Selkie	2022	Unknown	Active

== Reactions to activism and leadership ==
Watson has stated that he does not consider himself a 'protester', but an 'interventionist', as he considers protesting as too submissive. He often takes the attitude that he represents (or stands in for) law enforcement which is either unwilling or unable to enforce existing laws.

His leadership style has variously been called arrogant, as well as pushing himself too much "front and center", which was cited as one of the reasons for expulsion from Greenpeace. The atmosphere aboard his vessels has been compared to an "anarchy run by God".

The former member of Sea Shepherd and captain of the MY Ady Gil, Pete Bethune, described Watson as "morally bankrupt" who would order the intentional sinking of his own ships like the Ady Gil as a means to "garner sympathy with the public and to create better TV". Watson denied this, saying, "No one ordered him to scuttle it. Pete Bethune was captain of the Ady Gil; all decisions on the Ady Gil were his."

=== Awards ===
Paul Watson received the Jules Verne Award on October 10, 2012. He was the second person after Captain Jacques Cousteau to be honored with a Jules Verne Award dedicated to environmentalists and adventurers. On June 28, 2010, Paul received the Asociación de Amigos del Museo de Anclas Philippe Cousteau: Defense of Marine Life Award, in recognition of his merits achieved by the work done in defense of marine life. In 2002, Paul was inducted into the US Animal Rights Hall of Fame for his outstanding contributions to animal liberation. Paul received the George H. W. Bush Daily Points of Light Award in 1999 and in 2000, he was named one of Time Magazine's Top 20 Environmental Heroes of the 20th Century. On May 23, 2019, Paul Watson received an official commendation by Connecticut Governor Ned Lamont stating that the "State of Connecticut conveyed both honor and recognition to Captain Paul Watson." In 2007 Watson received the Amazon Peace Prize presented by the Vice President of Ecuador Lenin Moreno. In September 2024, The Perfect World Foundation announced that Watson would receive the 2025 Perfect World Foundation Award. On November 19, 2024, Captain Paul Watson was awarded the Citoyen d’honneur de la Ville de Paris, Honorary Citizen of the City of Paris. On February 14, 2025, he was awarded The Medal of the National Assembly by Yaël Braun-Pivet the Présidente de l' Assemblée Nationale et Hervé Berville, député des Côtes d' Armor. On March 2, 2025, Captain Watson was awarded the medal for the city of Nice by Maire de Nice Christian Estrosi, President del la Métropole, Président délégué de la Région Provence -Alpes-Côte d’Azur.

=== Media portrayals ===
A biographical documentary on Paul Watson's early life and background entitled Pirate for the Sea was produced by Ron Colby in 2008. The 2008 documentary At the Edge of the World chronicled the efforts of Watson and 45 volunteers to hinder the Japanese whaling fleet in the waters around Antarctica. In 2010, long time friend and filmmaker Peter Brown released the documentary Confessions of an Eco-Terrorist, a satirical look back at the last 30 years of actions. The documentary Eco-Pirate: The Story of Paul Watson from 2011 features interviews and footage with early Greenpeace members Rex Weyler and Patrick Moore.

Watson, Whale Wars, and the Japanese whaling industry were satirized in the South Park episode "Whale Whores". In its fictional Larry King show, Watson himself was called "an unorganized incompetent media whore who thought lying to everyone was OK as long as it served his cause" and "A smug, narcoleptic liar with no credibility".

Watson responded to the South Park episode by stating: "My understanding is that the Japanese Prime Minister was not amused and the whalers and dolphin killers are enraged at the way they were portrayed," Watson said. "That's music to my ears. If the humorless whale killers and the bank rollers of the dolphin killers did not like the show, then that's all I need to applaud it."

Watson was portrayed (along with whale biologist, Nan Hauser), during a 60 Minutes episode that aired in 2013, as contributing to the return of the humpback whale populations in the South Pacific.

The 2019 documentary film Watson, directed by Lesley Chilcott, features interviews with Watson. The film also aired on Animal Planet on December 22, 2019.

== List of works ==
- Sea Shepherd: My Fight for Whales and Seals (1981) ISBN 0-393-01499-1
- Earthforce! An Earth Warrior's Guide to Strategy (1993) ISBN 0-9616019-5-7
- Ocean Warrior: My Battle to End the Illegal Slaughter on the High Seas (1994) ISBN 1-55013-599-6
- Seal Wars: Twenty-Five Years on the Front Lines With the Harp Seals (2002) ISBN 1-55297-751-X
- Contributor to Terrorists or Freedom Fighters?: Reflections on the Liberations of Animals (2004) ISBN 1-59056-054-X
- Earthforce! An Earth Warrior's Guide to Strategy 2nd Edition (2012) ISBN 978-1-61419-016-5
- The War That Saved the Whales (2019) ISBN 978-0-9600391-1-1
- Songs from the Southern Ocean (2020) ISBN 979-8-6251-7599-9
- The Haunted Mariner (2020) ISBN 978-1-0892-1371-0
- Dealing with Climate Change and Stress (2020) ISBN 979-8-6299-7272-3
- Orcapedia (2020) ISBN 978-1-57067-826-4
- Desperate Mythologies: Theology, Ecology and the General Insanity of Humanity (2020) ISBN 979-8-6433-7607-1
- Death of a Whale (2021) ISBN 978-1-57067-401-3
- URGENT! Save Our Ocean to Survive Climate Change (2021) ISBN 978-1-57067-403-7
- Mr. Mindbomb -Eco-Hero and Greenpeace Co-Founder Bob Hunter (2023) ISBN 978-1-77160-624-0
- Introduction and Chapter Contributor to Wildeor – The Wild Life and Living Legacy of Dave Foreman (2023) ISBN 978-1-7335190-4-5
- We Are the Ocean (2022) Children's Book ISBN 978-1-939053-46-6
- We Are the Ocesn Wir sind der Ozean (German edition) (2024) ISBN 978-3-86935-471-2

== See also ==
- List of conservationists
- List of vegans
