= Matthew 25: Ministries =

US-based non-profit organization

- Formation: 1995; 31 years ago
- Type: 501(c)(3)
- Tax ID no.: 31-1348100
- Legal status: Nonprofit organization
- Purpose: Humanitarian Aid and Disaster Relief
- Headquarters: Blue Ash, Ohio, U.S.
- Coordinates: 39.266109°N 84.373478°W
- Region served: North America, Central America, Caribbean, South America, Sub-Saharan Africa
- Founder: Rev. Wendell Mettey
- Chief Executive Officer: Tim Mettey
- Chairman: Michael Brandy Jr.
- Subsidiaries: M25M Haiti, LLC
- Revenue: $336,909,031 (2020)
- Expenses: $270,990,977 (2020)
- Website: m25m.org

Matthew 25: Ministries is an international humanitarian aid and disaster relief organization headquartered in Blue Ash, Ohio, US. Matthew 25: Ministries provides humanitarian aid and disaster relief to the poor throughout the US and around the world. Matthew 25 collects excess products from corporations and manufacturers as well as the general public and ships these donations to those in need.

== Mission ==
Matthew 25: Ministries’ mission is based on Matthew 25:34–25:40. Matthew 25: Ministries provides food, water, clothing, shelter, medical care and humanitarian supplies to the poor. Matthew 25 supports education by shipping school supplies to children and providing micro-enterprise opportunities for adults.

== History ==
Matthew 25: Ministries began as the result of a trip that Founder and President Reverend Wendell Mettey made with a group of doctors and nurses to Nicaragua in 1990.

Seeing the poverty there, Pastor Mettey felt he needed to find a way to help the people of Nicaragua. He was able to develop a system to collect and redistribute food, clothing, personal care, cleaning, medical, and educational supplies which were no longer useful by US standards.

Since 1991, Matthew 25 has established partners throughout the United States and around the world. Matthew 25 has grown from a small group of individuals carrying supplies in suitcases to an international humanitarian aid and disaster relief organization distributing over 14,000,000 pounds of products around the world each year. In 2012, Matthew 25 surpassed one billion dollars in aid shipped around the world since 1991. In 2014 Matthew 25: Ministries topped 7,000 containers shipped, welcomed 80,000 visitors to the Global Village, and added an additional 46,000 square feet of warehouse space to the now 170,000 square foot facility.

Following Rev. Mettey's retirement from Matthew 25: Ministries, in 2018 the organization entered into a license agreement with him to pay him $162,000 per year in order to license works based on his name, image, likeness, as well as Rev. Mettet's past and future published and unpublished works. Later the same year, the organization entered into an agreement to reimburse Rev. Mattey and his spouse up to $100,000 of medical expenses per year, in addition to the licensing fees. Rev. Mettey is the father of the organization's chief executive officer Tim Metty.

== Programs ==
Matthew 25: Ministries' primary distribution program is "Caring For a Needy World With the Things We Throw Away." Through this program, Matthew 25 distributes clothing, medical supplies, personal care items, school supplies, food and beverages, household supplies, cleaning products, reblended paint and micro-enterprise supplies. In addition to providing ongoing humanitarian aid, Matthew 25: Ministries has developed a number of programs designed to meet specific needs throughout the US and worldwide:

- Matthew 25's "Food Processing Center" produces a shelf-stable, nutritionally enhanced rice/soy blend for $0.10 a meal. As of 2014, Matthew 25: Ministries has produced 7,000,000 meals to date.
- Matthew 25's "Grow Right Micronutrient Supplement" enhances children's nutritional health by providing 15 micronutrients in a powdered drink formula.
- Matthew 25's "Write Your Future" program supports education through the manufacture of school notebooks and the packaging of Education Kits for children. The Pencil Manufacturing Center produces full-sized pencils from recycled materials that support the program, which enhances the learning environment for disadvantaged children by providing them with the basic supplies that are essential to literacy and education.
- Matthew 25's "Fill Center" repackages detergent and soap into ready-to-use liquid products.
- Matthew 25's "Rainbow Paint Reblending Program" collects and reblends latex paint from municipalities, environmental companies, paint manufacturers, painting contractors, paint & hardware stores and individuals and redistributes it to underdeveloped areas and to developing countries.
- Matthew 25's "Building a New Life" program supports the construction of houses and the development of communities in Nicaragua and Haiti.
- Matthew 25's "Disaster Relief Services" provide relief, recovery and rebuilding support to areas effected by natural disasters.
- Matthew 25's "Global Village Experience" is a three-dimensional replica of a third world village and shows the living conditions and lifestyle of the poor. In January 2013, Matthew 25 expanded the Global Village Experience to more accurately portray living conditions around the world with a specific focus on American Indian reservations, Appalachia, and a developing country garbage dump. Matthew 25 also incorporated the devastating effects of natural disasters by adding life-size displays of floods, tsunamis, earthquakes, hurricanes and other disasters to which Matthew 25: Ministries has responded. In 2014, Matthew 25: Ministries welcomed 80,000 visitors to the Global Village.

== Volunteerism ==
Matthew 25: Ministries relies on volunteers to assist in their work. The majority of the donated goods received are evaluated, sorted, and processed by volunteers in preparation for shipment to various parts of the world. In 2014 nearly 50,000 volunteers donated their time serving those in need at Matthew 25: Ministries.

== Disaster response and relief ==
Matthew 25: Ministries works with partners in the affected areas in order to assist those in need.

Matthew 25: Ministries ships pre-sorted, pre-processed, requested items that are appropriate and needed to the disaster area. This ensures that the products will bring relief to the victims instead of creating additional work for the responders in the area. According to the United Nations Disaster Relief Organization, "The impulsive generosity of governments, organizations, and individuals alike can cause as much chaos and confusion as the disaster itself."

Matthew 25: Ministries has responded to a variety of natural disasters including: Hurricane Katrina, the 2010 Haiti earthquake, the 2011 Japan earthquake and tsunami, the 2012 Colorado wildfires, Hurricane Sandy, the 2013 Moore tornado, Typhoon Haiyan in 2013, and the Ebola outbreak in Liberia in 2014.

== Affiliations ==
Matthew 25: Ministries maintains the following professional affiliations and associations:

- United States Agency for International Development
- Ohio Association of Nonprofit Organizations
- Greater Cincinnati Regional Chamber of Commerce
- Blue Ash Business Association
- Independent Charities of America/Charities Under 1% Overhead
- Combined Federal Campaign/Multiple State Combined Charitable Campaigns
- The Better Business Bureau’s Wise Giving Alliance.

== Rankings ==
- Matthew 25: Ministries is ranked highly on Forbes' list of the 20 Most Efficient Large Charities in the US.
- Matthew 25: Ministries is also ranked in the Top Five four-star charities on Charity Navigator.
- Matthew 25: Ministries is accredited by the Better Business Bureau through the "Wise Giving Alliance Standards".
- Matthew 25: Ministries participates in the Combined Federal Campaign, the Federal Government's workplace philanthropy program that requires all non-profit participants to meet the highest standards of transparency and efficiency in the industry.
