= The Russian Woodpecker =

2015 documentary film directed by Chad Gracia

- Film poster
- Directed by: Chad Gracia
- Written by: Chad Gracia
- Produced by: Mike Lerner; Ram Devineni; Chad Gracia
- Cinematography: Artem Ryzhykov
- Edited by: Chad Gracia; Devin Tanchum
- Music by: Katya Mihailova
- Production companies: Roast Beef Productions; Rattapallax Productions; Gracia Films
- Release date: 24 January 2015 (Sundance)
- Running time: 82 minutes
- Countries: United States; United Kingdom; Ukraine
- Languages: English; Russian
- Box office: $1,644

The Russian Woodpecker is a 2015 documentary film written, produced and directed by Chad Gracia following Fedor Alexandrovich's investigation into the Chernobyl disaster. It is Gracia's directorial debut feature. The film premiered in the "World Cinema Documentary" competition at 2015 Sundance Film Festival on 24 January 2015 and won the World Cinema Documentary Grand Jury Prize at the festival.

== Synopsis ==
The films focuses on Fedor Alexandrovich's research into the cause of the Chernobyl nuclear disaster in Ukraine and its potential connection to a Soviet Cold War-era structure, the Duga over-the-horizon radio antenna. His investigation is interrupted and impacted by the 2014 Euromaidan uprising, which eventually led to the ousting of the president Viktor Yanukovych.

== Production ==
During the production of the film, cinematographer Artem Ryzhykov was injured by sniper fire at Euromaidan and his equipment was destroyed. Two people standing next to him were killed.

== Promotion ==
A clip from the film was released online on 20 January 2015.

== Reception ==
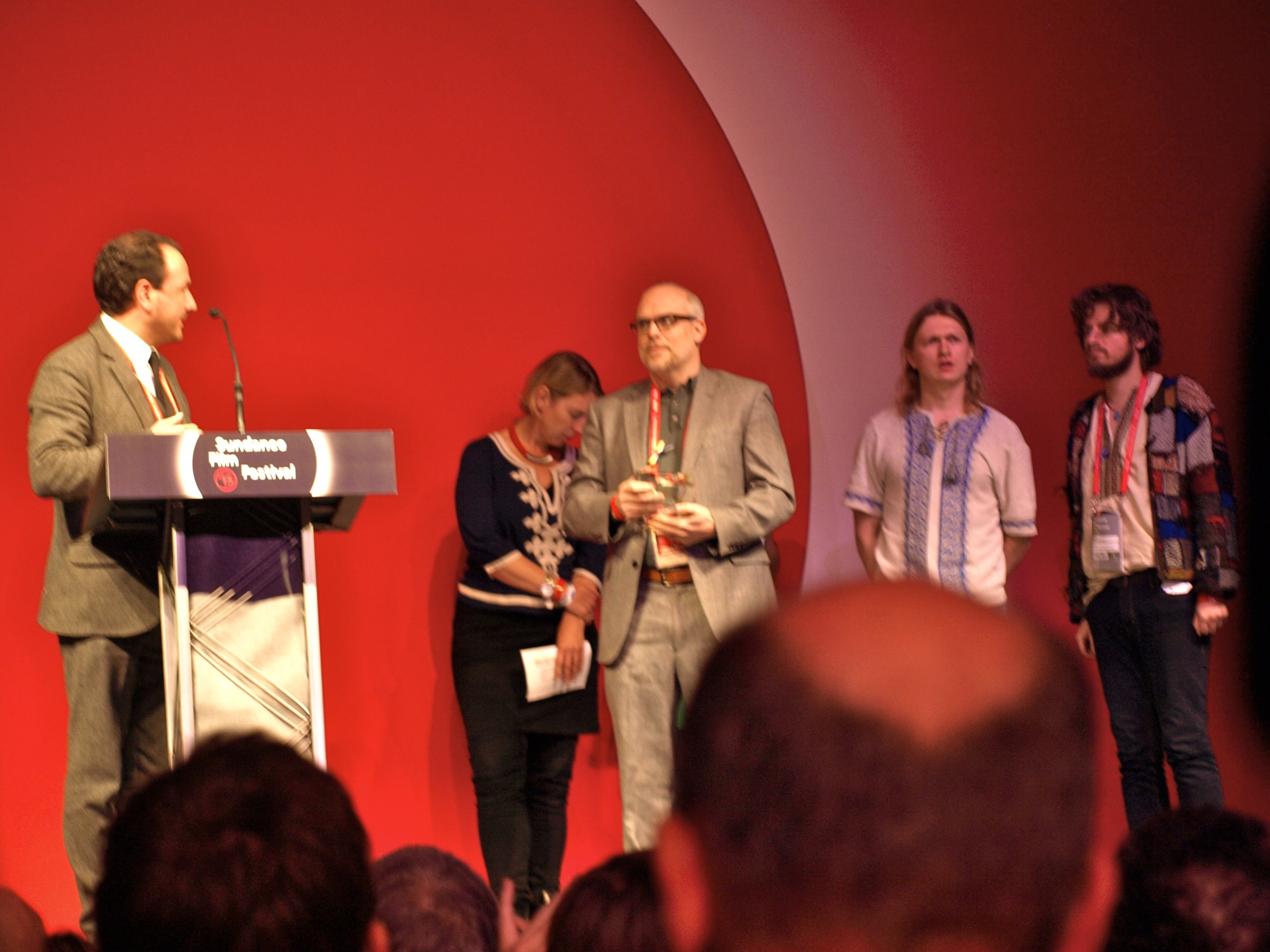
(From L to R) Producer Mike Lerner, Director Chad Gracia, cinematographer Artem Ryzhykov and Fedor Alexandrovich at the 2015 Sundance Film Festival.

The Russian Woodpecker was well received by most critics. On review aggregator Rotten Tomatoes, the film has a rating of 96% based on 23 reviews with a weighted average score of 8.1/10. On Metacritic, the film has a score of 74% based on 8 critics, indicating "generally favorable reviews".

Charlie Phillips of The Guardian gave the film four out of five stars, stating "Gracia succeeds brilliantly in delivering a chilling warning about where Putin and his spooks might go next, by giving Fedor full licence to act the biblical prophet" as "his fantasies collid[e] with real dangerous politics." Dennis Harvey of Variety also gave the film a positive review saying that it is "surprisingly inventive, even buoyant in its presentation of several issues that could scarcely be more sobering." Drew Taylor of IndieWire graded the film "A" and in his review said that "[this] is the story of two countries that may have divided but who are still linked through their politics, exports and the ghosts that still wander the contaminated grounds of both Chernobyl... and the Russian Woodpecker." Daniel Walber of Nonfics also gave the film a positive review, summarizing it as "first and foremost a thrilling conspiracy theory documentary about Fedor Alexandrovich and his quest for the truth behind the Chernobyl nuclear disaster." Leslie Felperin of The Hollywood Reporter, praising the film, said that "given the film's narrative encompasses the death of thousands of people at various points in Ukrainian history, and most recently hundreds in the recent conflict [...] Gracia finds the humor in many of the situations, and has properly Slavic feel for the absurd. Bouncy animation and fish-eye lens are frequently deployed to create a stylized sense of playfulness which only enhances the film's many compelling qualities."

By contrast, in his "C+" review for The A.V. Club, Mike D'Angelo was unimpressed by the central thesis of the film, describing Alexandrovich's conspiracy theory as "in terms of plausibility [being] roughly on a par with 'George W. Bush allowed 3,000 Americans to be murdered by Al Qaeda ... so he could justify invading Iraq.'" D'Angelo is also skeptical about the inclusion of the Euromaidan protests in the film, wryly noting that "it's almost as if Alexandrovich and director Chad Gracia use this real-world conflict to distract viewers from the lack of concrete evidence, in the same way that Alexandrovich claims the Chernobyl disaster was meant as a diversion." Similarly, Jeremy Mathews in his review for Paste Magazine writes: "As the filmmakers try to tie together the threads of the Chernobyl disaster, cold war paranoia and the modern conflict between Russia and Ukraine, [the documentary's] knots start to slip." Mathews also points out a fundamental contradiction in the filmmakers' narrative, stating: "When your mystery ends with 'this guy went rogue to subvert the will of the government', it doesn't logically follow to say 'the government that he subverted is the root cause.'" Historian Serhii Plokhy, who wrote the investigative book Chernobyl: History of a Tragedy, cites the film as an "example of the ease with which conspiracy vitiates meaningful debate about Chernobyl".

== Accolades ==
Award / Film Festival	Category	Recipient(s)	Result
31st Sundance Film Festival	Grand Jury Prize (World Cinema Documentary)	Chad Gracia	Won
31st International Documentary Association Awards	Won (Best Cinematography)	Artem Ryzhykov	Won
2015 Biografilm Festival	Life Tales Award	Chad Gracia	Won
2015 Biografilm Festival	Premio HERA "Nuovi Talenti"	Chad Gracia	Won

Awards
Preceded by The Return to Homs	Sundance Grand Jury Prize: World Cinema Documentary; 2015	Succeeded by TBD
