= Pervert Park =

2014 film by Frida and Lasse Barkfors

- Directed by: Lasse and Frida Barkfors
- Produced by: Anne Köhncke
- Production company: Final Cut for Real
- Release date: 2014
- Running time: 75 minutes
- Countries: Denmark; Sweden
- Language: English

Pervert Park is a 2014 documentary film directed by Swedish-Danish filmmaking couple Frida and Lasse Barkfors. The film's focus is Palace Mobile Park in St. Petersburg, Florida, nicknamed "Pervert Park", which houses over 100 convicted sex offenders. The film premiered at Copenhagen International Documentary Festival. It won the World Cinema Documentary Special Jury Award for Impact at the 2015 Sundance Film Festival. It had a television premiere as an episode of POV on July 11, 2016.

== Production ==
The Barkfors read an article about Florida Justice Transitions in a Danish newspaper which provoked their interest in the park, which they got the impression was "a society of its own". They visited the park for the first time in 2010 and found it to be very different from their expectations. The film took four years to make.

== See also ==
- Florida Civil Commitment Center
- Miracle Village (community)
