= Desoto Annex =

State prison in Arcadia, Florida, US

Coordinates: 27°12′16″N 81°39′56″W

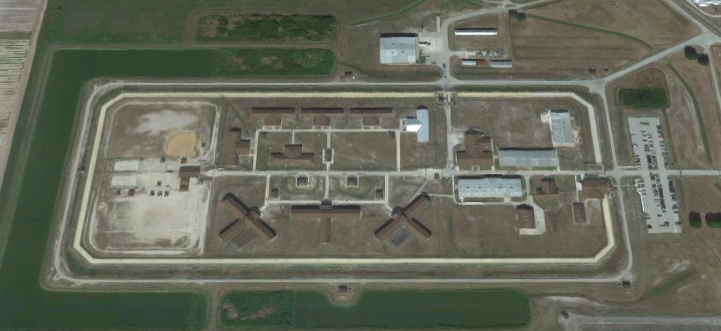
- Overhead view of Desoto Annex
- Interactive map of Desoto Annex
- Location: 13617 Southeast Highway 70 Arcadia, Florida
- Status: Operational
- Security class: Minimum, medium, and close
- Capacity: 2,009 = 1,699 (main unit) + 310 (work camp)
- Population: 1,902 = 1,597 (main unit) + 305 (work camp) (April 17, 2025)
- Opened: 1996
- Managed by: Florida Department of Corrections
- Warden: Shane Baker

The Desoto Annex is a state prison for men located in Arcadia, DeSoto County, Florida, owned and operated by the Florida Department of Corrections.

This facility has a mix of security levels, including minimum, medium, and close, and houses adult male offenders. Desoto Annex first opened in 1996 as an extension to the main Desoto facility, which has since closed. The Annex holds a maximum of 2,009 prisoners.
