= Emily Hunter =

Canadian activist, author and filmmaker

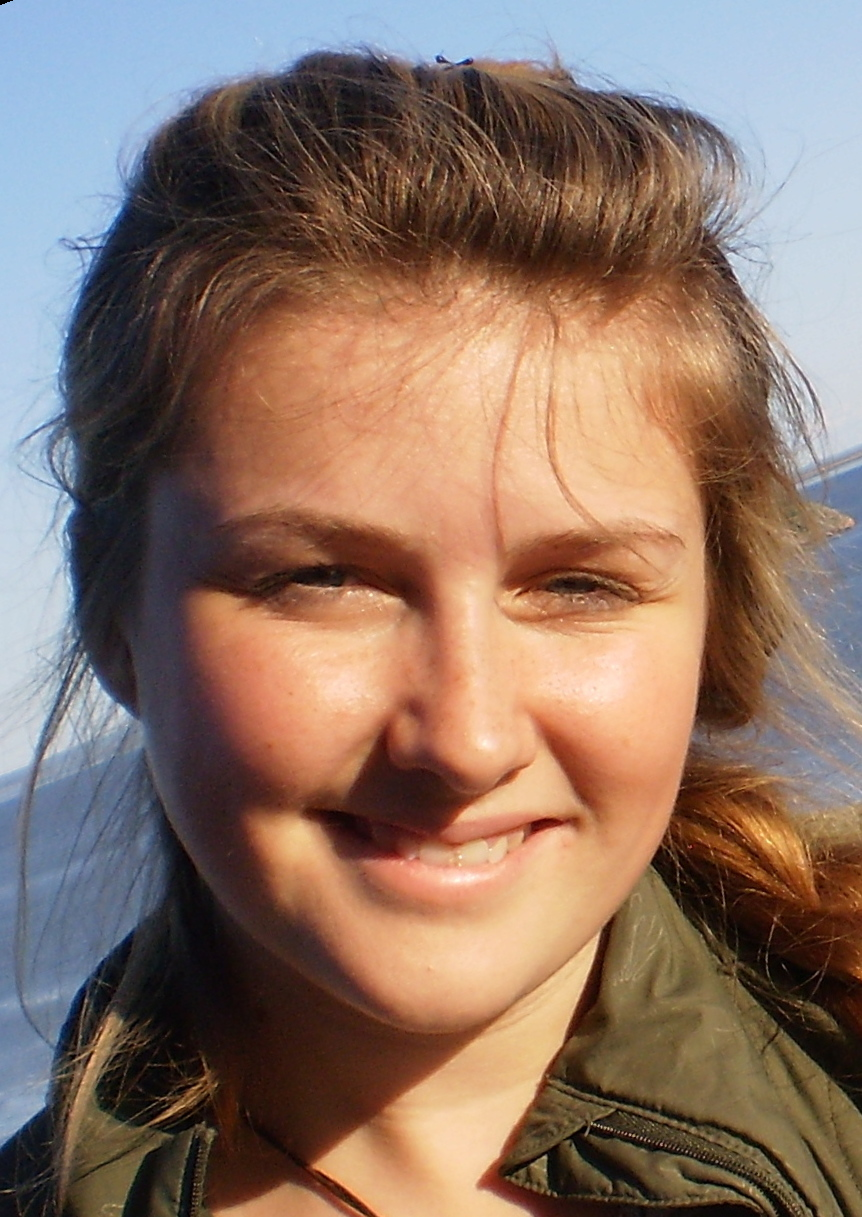

Personal details
- Born: Emily Hunter; May 20, 1984 (age 42) Vancouver, British Columbia, Canada
- Education: University of Toronto (BA)

Emily Hunter (born May 20, 1984) is a Canadian activist, author and filmmaker. She is the daughter of the late Robert Hunter, first president of Greenpeace and Bobbi Hunter, co-founder of Greenpeace. She has been a campaigner for nearly a decade on numerous environmental causes, from fighting whaling to climate change. She is known in Canada as a writer for THIS magazine and as environmental correspondent for MTV News.

She studied at the Scarborough campus of the University of Toronto, graduating with a bachelor of arts degree.

== Biography ==
=== Environmental activism ===
Emily Hunter was born in Vancouver, a daughter of the late Robert Hunter, Greenpeace’s founding president. and co-founder Bobbi Hunter. Her own activism began at the age of 20 years when she joined her first environmental campaign with the Sea Shepherd Conservation Society to protect the Galapagos Marine Reserve. She and other crew members were threatened and taken hostage for 1 day by fishermen who demanded further exploitation of the Sea Cucumber fishery. Hunter was the only woman in the group and found the experience of being an eco-warrior on the frontline an exhilarating experience.

Soon after her activism began, her father died 2005. To continue her family's legacy, Hunter joined the Sea Shepherd campaign in the Antarctic Ocean to stop whaling by Japan, serving as quartermaster and deckhand. In the 2005–2006 Whale Defense campaign, Captain Paul Watson and Emily spread the ashes of her father across an iceberg. In the 2008–2009 campaign called "Operation Musashi," Hunter was cast as one of the characters in season two of the reality TV-show Whale Wars.

Hunter has taken part in the Canadian Youth Climate Coalition, EarthRoots and the Greenpeace Tar Sands project.

In October 2010, Hunter joined the group 350.org to help coordinate a global day of action on climate change. She was the national campaigner for Canada of the 10/10/10 campaign, coordinating a climate "work party" in every province and territory including a pledge by a Member of Provincial Parliament. One year later she joined DeforestACTION in a campaign to raise awareness about deforestation in Borneo from palm oil plantations. Hunter is working with Cineboxx Film & Television on a documentary film in development about the palm oil issue.

For her work, Hunter has gained a public profile. She was named Top Canadians to Watch Under 30 in Flare Magazine in 2011 and Top 10 Amazing Woman Trying to Save the Planet by AOL's Lemondrop.com in 2010. Hunter appeared in several documentary films, including At the Edge of the World by Dan Stone (2008), Eco-Pirate: The Story of Paul Watson by Trish Dolman (2011), and Revolution by Rob Stewart (2013), as well as, a TV-documentary called Green Heroes. She has appeared on NPR, Voice of America, CBC News Network, A Current Affairs Australia and others. She was written about in several books, including: The Whale Warriors (2007) by Peter Heller and The Last Whale (2008) by Chris Pash.

She is the author of "The Next Eco-Warriors", published in Canada in 2011.

Her new 2013 project is "Activism 2.0", a study of global green activists. Hunter will be followed by a film crew as she travels around the world documenting the 21st-century tactics of environmental protestors. Campaigns under scrutiny include The Black Fish action against illegal driftnet fishery in the Mediterranean and the "divestment" movement on North American university campuses.

== See also ==
- Mitch Daniels
- Thomas Homer-Dixon
- Mike Hudema
- Nikolai Kudryavtsev
- Andrew Nikiforuk
