= Rex Weyler =

American-Canadian author, journalist and ecologist

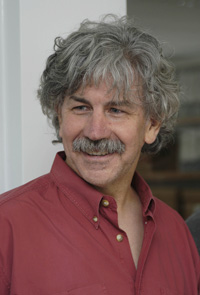
- Born: 10 September 1947 (age 78); Denver, Colorado, U.S.
- Occupations: Author, Journalist, Ecologist
- Writing career
- Genres: Essays, News, Non-fiction

Rex Weyler (born September 10, 1947) is an American-Canadian author, journalist and ecologist. He has worked as a writer, editor, and publisher. In the 1970s, Weyler served as a director of the original Greenpeace Foundation, and as campaign photographer and publisher of the Greenpeace Chronicles. He was a cofounder of Greenpeace International in 1979.

Weyler is the author of multiple books about Greenpeace history (Greenpeace: The Inside Story) and religious commentary (The Jesus Sayings: A Quest for His Authentic Message). In the 1990s, he coauthored a U.S. patent for music tuning software and co-founded Justonic Tuning Inc. with his partner Bill Gannon, to develop and market the product.

== Life and education ==
Weyler attended high school with future first lady Laura Welch Bush and future US Army General Tommy Franks.)

On April 5, 2005, the Urban Environmental Policy Center on the Occidental College campus awarded Weyler and Dennis Zane, a fellow student organizer, the Alumni Community Action Award.

Weyler has three siblings. He married Glenn Jonathans in Nijmegen, Netherlands in 1971 and immigrated to Canada in 1972. Weyler and Jonathans divorced in 1980. Weyler married Lisa Gibbons in 1991. They now live on Cortes Island B.C., Canada. Lisa Gibbons is an artist and youth educator. Weyler and Gibbons have 3 sons, and have been foster parents with the BC Federation of Foster Parents.

== Journalism ==
In 1973, at the age of 26, Weyler received his first journalism position at the North Shore News in Vancouver, B.C. Canada. Later that year, he began covering the original Greenpeace whale campaign story, and later, from 1975 to 1980, served as editor and publisher for the Greenpeace Chronicles newspaper. This paper was one of the first international environmental publications, with stories by writers Lawrence Ferlinghetti, Robert Hunter, Paul Watson, John C. Lilly, Kitty Tucker, Ben Metcalfe, and David Garrick, and art and cartoons by cartoonists Ralph Steadman and Ron Cobb.

From 1980 to 1982, Weyler was publisher, contributing editor, and writer for New Age Journal in Allston, MA. His stories for New Age Journal about conflicts between the FBI and the American Indian Movement led to a book on that subject, Blood of the Land, Everest House, 1982.

From 1998 to 2002, Weyler served as publisher and editor of Shared Vision Magazine in Vancouver, B.C., Canada. He published stories about Greenpeace history and the American Indian Movement in the Vancouver Sun newspaper and contributed articles to British Columbia’s first major on-line news site, The Tyee.

In 2007, Weyler founded the Institute for Citizen Journalism, and since 2008, Weyler has posted a monthly ecology column, Deep Green, at Greenpeace International, and has contributed stories to Resilience, Counter Currents, the Watershed Sentinel, and other online magazines.

In 2013, Weyler served as Writer-in-Residence at the University of Fraser Valley, in British Columbia, Canada.

== Greenpeace ==
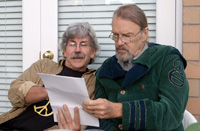
Rex Weyler and Bob Hunter

Between 1973 and 1982, Weyler served as a director of the original Greenpeace Foundation, campaign photographer and reporter, and as editor of the Greenpeace Chronicles magazine. He was a co-founder of Greenpeace International in 1979.

In 1975, Weyler sailed on the first Greenpeace whale campaign, and subsequent whale and seal campaigns. His photographs and news accounts of these campaigns were widely published.

He is the author of a history of the first decade of Greenpeace, Greenpeace: The Inside Story (Raincoast, Rodale, 2004).

Since leaving Greenpeace in 1982, Weyler has remained active in environmental and peace issues. In 1991, he helped draft dioxin emission levels for pulp mills in British Columbia. In 2006, he served as Program Coordinator for World Peace Forum 2006.

Weyler is featured in the documentary, Greenpeace: Making a Stand.

== Books by Rex Weyler ==
- Weyler, Rex (2008) The Jesus Sayings: A Quest for His Authentic Message (House of Anansi Press, 2008)
- Weyler, Rex (2004) Greenpeace: The Inside Story (Raincoast Books, Rodale, 2004). Finalist, Shaughnessy Cohen Prize for Political Writing, 2004.
- Weyler, Rex (2004) Greenpeace: An Insider's Account (UK);
- Weyler, Rex (2004) Greenpeace: How a Group of Ecologists, Journalists, and Visionaries Changed the World (US: Rodale), ISBN 978-1-59486-106-2.
- Weyler, Rex with Rick Fields, Peggy Taylor, Rick Ingrasci (1984) Chop Wood, Carry Water: Finding Spiritual Fulfillment in Everyday Life (Tarcher)
- Weyler, Rex (1982) Blood of the Land (Everest House, 1982; New Society Publishers, 1992)
- Weyler, Rex with Robert Hunter (1978) To Save a Whale (Chronicle Books).
- Weyler, Rex with Daphne Marlatt and Robert Minden (1975) Steveston Recollected (UBC, Provincial Archives, out of print).

Weyler has published articles and essays on the Greenpeace website, his website, and the following anthologies, among other places: The Power of the People, ed. Robert Cooney and Helen Michalowski (New Society Publishers, 1987); Beyond Hypnosis by Dr. Lee Pulos (Omega Press, San Francisco, 1990); Shorelines (Kingfisher Press, B.C., 1995); Witness, Twenty-five Years on the Environmental Front Line (Andre Deutsch, London, 1996); Greenpeace: Changing the World, ed. Conny Boettger, Fouad Hamdan (Rasch & Röhring, 2001); The Book of Letters: 150 Years of Private Canadian Correspondence, by Paul and Audrey Grescoe (Macfarlane Walter & Ross, 2002).

== Awards and honours ==
- Finalist, Shaughnessy-Cohen Award for Political Writing; 2004.
- Publishers Weekly, "Best Books of 2004," Greenpeace: The Inside Story.
- Finalist, Hubert Evans Award for Non-Fiction, BC Book Awards, 2004.
- Alumni Community Action Award, Urban Environmental Policy Center, Los Angeles, April 2005.
