= Behind The Cove =

Behind "The Cove": The Quiet Japanese Speak Out
- Japanese DVD cover

Japanese name
- Kanji: ビハインド・ザ・コーヴ 〜捕鯨問題の謎に迫る〜
Transcriptions
- Revised Hepburn: bihaindo za kōvu 〜hogeimondai no nazo ni semaru〜
- Directed by: Keiko Yagi
- Produced by: Keiko Yagi
- Narrated by: Russell Goodall
- Edited by: Keiko Yagi
- Music by: Nariaki Kato
- Distributed by: Yagi Film Limited
- Release date: 4 September 2015
- Running time: 110 minutes
- Country: Japan
- Language: Japanese

Behind "The Cove": The Quiet Japanese Speak Out (Japanese: ビハインド・ザ・コーヴ 〜捕鯨問題の謎に迫る〜, Hepburn: bihaindo za kōvu 〜hogeimondai no nazo ni semaru〜) is a 2015 Japanese documentary film directed and produced by Keiko Yagi.

It is the first film in response to the Academy Award winning 2009 anti-whaling documentary film The Cove, and seeks to show the views of both sides of the international whaling debate, particularly focusing on the town of Taiji, Japan.

== Synopsis ==
On March 31, 2014, the International Court of Justice ordered Japan to stop its Antarctic whaling program.

Fearing that ancestral culinary traditions will disappear, director Keiko Yagi decided to investigate and understand what motivates regular attacks against Japan on whaling. With a camera, Keiko Yagi traveled to Taiji, home of Oscar-winning 2009 documentary film "The Cove". For four months, Keiko Yagi interviewed the various protagonists of the film "The Cove", from its director to the people of Taiji through the official organizations and the militant associations.

== Cast ==
| Name | Role |
|---|---|
| Louie Psihoyos | Director of The Cove |
| Ric O'Barry | Founder of Dolphin Project |
| Jōji Morishita (森下丈二) | IWC Japanese Government Representative |
| Kunio Yonezawa (米澤邦男) | IWC Japan's Chief Representative of Japan |
| Kazuo Shima (島一雄) | IWC Japan's Chief Representative of Japan |
| Masayuki Komatsu (小松正之) | IWC Japan's Chief Representative of Japan |
| Hideki Moronuki (諸貫秀樹) | Fisheries negotiator of the Fisheries Agency |
| David Hance | Sea Shepherd 2014 leader |
| Simon Wearne | TV program Whale Wars former photographer |
| Lars Wallow | Professor of ecology at the University of Oslo |
| Kazuo Yamamura (山村和夫) | President of the Whaling Association of Japan |
| Yoshito Umezaki (梅崎義人) | Fisheries journalist |
| Kazutaka Sangen (三軒一高) | Mayor of Taiji |
| Akio Usagawa (宇佐川彰男) | Taiji chief of Education Committee |
| Katsuyuki Horibata (堀瑞勝之) | Taiji elementary school's principal |
Taiji people
Dolphin Project members

== Reception ==
Behind 'The Cove' received a mostly negative response from Western critics. Robert Abele of the Los Angeles Times described it as "a regrettably amateurish effort in tone, style and pacing, as if [Yagi's] first cut were her final cut. It's too scattershot to be persuasive, even if occasionally it sparks thought about issues of cultural tradition, unfair international agreements, and nationalistic defensiveness." Luke Y. Thompson of The Village Voice was also critical of the film, writing, "Japan's answer to the Oscar-winning, 2009 anti-dolphin-hunting documentary The Cove is driven more by agenda than much discernible skill in the areas of camera, editing, storytelling, or interview technique." He added, "Probably about a quarter of the film's runtime is screenshots of web browsers, which is apt, as this is essentially a Condescending Wonka meme taken to feature length."

== Accolades ==
- Montreal World Film Festival, Official Screening (2015)
- London International Filmmaker Festival, Best Director of a Feature Documentary (February 2018)
- Los Angeles Independent Film Festival Awards, First Time Filmmaker (October 2016)
- 13th Japan Wildlife Film Festival, New Perspective Award (April 2018)
- Hollywood International Moving Pictures Film Festival, Award of Recognition (October 2016)
- Hollywood International Independent Documentary Awards, Award of Excellence (October 2016)
- Pune Independent Film Festival, Best Woman Filmmaker (Fall 2016)
- International Filmmaker Festival of New York, Honorable Mention (May 2018)
- London Greek Film Festival, Semi-finalist (2018)
- Miami Independent Film Festival, Feature Documentary (2017)
- Calcutta International Cult Film Festival, Golden Fox Award Nominee for Best Educational Film (2017)
- Calcutta International Cult Film Festival, Films of the Month Educational Film Winner (January 2017)
- Portsmouth International Film Festival, Sound in a Documentary (2017)
- Paris Art and Movie Awards, Meilleur Documentaire (2018)
