= Leilani Münter =

American racing driver and environmental activist

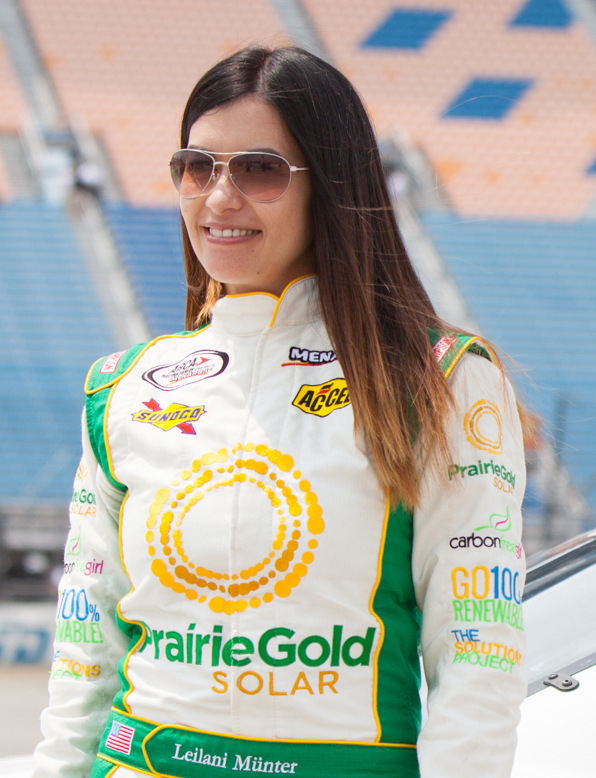
- Münter in 2014 at Chicagoland Speedway
- Born: Leilani Maaja Münter; February 18, 1974 (age 52) Rochester, Minnesota, U.S.

ARCA Menards Series career
- Debut season: 2010
- Starts: 18
- Wins: 0
- Poles: 0
- Best finish: 20th in 2018

Previous series
- 2007: Firestone Indy Lights
- Statistics up to date as of April 28, 2018.

Leilani Maaja Münter (born February 18, 1974) is an American former professional stock car racing driver and environmental activist. She last competed in the ARCA Menards Series, and previously drove in the Firestone Indy Lights, the development league of IndyCar.

== Early life and education ==
Münter is the child of a Japanese-American mother from the Island of Hawaii and a German father, who was working at the Hawaii State Hospital in Kāneʻohe. Her father relocated to Rochester, Minnesota for work at the Mayo Clinic, where she was born on February 18, 1974.

Prior to becoming a race car driver, Münter earned a bachelor's degree in biology, specializing in ecology, behavior, and evolution from the University of California, San Diego. During her college years, Münter was also a volunteer at a wildlife rescue and rehabilitation center. She is an almost lifelong vegetarian and became vegan in 2011.

== Racing career ==
Münter began racing in California in 2001 in the Allison Legacy Series. She debuted with a seventh place finish. In 2002, Münter made the move to Mooresville, North Carolina, widely regarded as the center for NASCAR racing. In 2003, she had her first start in the NASCAR Weekly Racing Series at South Boston Speedway, she finished ninth. She made her first speedway start in 2004 at Texas Motor Speedway and set a new record when she qualified fourth, the highest qualifying effort for a female driver at the track. It was also her first super late model race; she finished seventh. In 2006, she had her first full-time season in a race car. In her fifth race of the season, she had one of the biggest races of her career when she finished fourth, setting a new record at Texas Motor Speedway for the highest finish for a female driver in the history of the 1.5 mile speedway. Later that year, Münter became the first woman to qualify in the 45-year history of the Tony Bettenhausen Classic at Illiana Speedway in Indiana. In 43 stock car starts, Münter scored nineteen top-tens and nine top-five finishes. At the end of the 2006 racing season, she was set to make the move into the ARCA Series in 2007, a stepping stone series into NASCAR's top three series. In December 2006, she completed her ARCA rookie test at Daytona International Speedway. She was 24th quick of 59 race cars testing that day in a race car prepared by Andy Hillenburg, a retired driver who owns Fast Track Racing School, where Münter once worked at as an instructor.

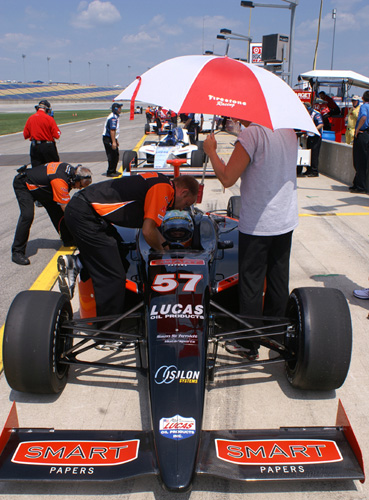
Münter during practice at Kentucky Speedway in 2007

In 2007, Münter became the fourth woman in history to compete in the Indy Pro Series, the development league of IndyCar. In May, Münter passed her Indy Pro Series rookie test at Kentucky Speedway. In August she signed a deal with three-time championship team Sam Schmidt Motorsports. She qualified fifth for her debut at Kentucky Speedway on August 11. She had trouble on a restart and dropped to thirteenth but raced her way back to the front of the field. She passed five cars in a lap and a half and turned in the fifth-fastest lap of the race with a speed of 192.399 mph. She was about to pass for fourth place when she was involved in a multi-car accident. Four-time Indy 500 champion Rick Mears, IndyCar driver Jaques Lazier, and many others in the IndyCar community spoke highly of Münter after her debut.

She got back in a stock car in December 2008, testing an ARCA car at Daytona International Speedway for NASCAR Sprint Cup Series driver James Hylton. In December 2009, she returned to ARCA testing at Daytona, driving the No. 59 NextEra Energy Resources Dodge for Mark Gibson Racing. In the final practice, Münter posted the seventh quickest lap with a speed of 181.77 mph, just 69 one-thousandths of a second behind Danica Patrick, who posted the fifth quickest time of the final practice. The two female drivers had previously worked together off the racetrack, in an ad campaign together in 2006 and 2007 for Hostess.

In the February 2010 ARCA Racing Series race at Daytona International Speedway, Münter was one of only three women to qualify for the race on speed alongside Danica Patrick and Alli Owens. She failed to finish the race, becoming collected in a ten-car accident.

In 2012, Münter drove in the ARCA Racing Series, driving for Tony Marks Racing in the season-opening 200 mile event at Daytona International Speedway, driving a car sponsored by donations from fans and carrying an ocean awareness paint scheme, featuring The Cove.

In 2014, Münter began racing in ARCA with Venturini Motorsports. She ran Daytona in the No. 55 Go 100% Renewable Energy racecar, where she was wrecked by a spinning car on lap 28 and finished the race in 28th place. Her second race of 2014 was her first race at Talladega Superspeedway where she finished 14th in the No. 55 Blackfish (film) race car sponsored by activist and creator of The Simpsons TV show, Sam Simon. She then finished 12th on the lead lap at Chicagoland Speedway in the No. 66 PrairieGold Solar/The Solutions Project racecar.

== Media ==
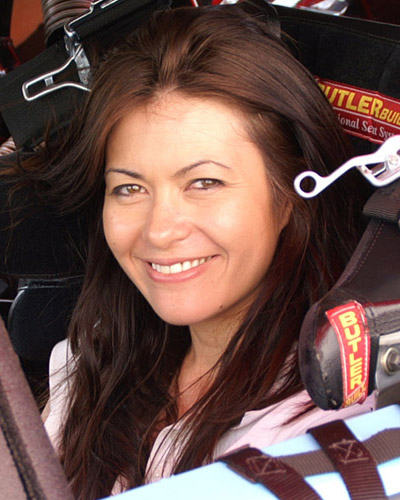
Münter at Texas Motor Speedway in 2006

Sports Illustrated named Münter one of the top ten female race car drivers in the world. Glamour Magazine named her an "Eco Hero." In 2012, Leilani was a recipient of ELLE Magazine's Genius Award. She was profiled on Discovery Planet Green's new 2010 television series "Fast Forward." Münter has also appeared as a model for Lucky Brand Jeans. She was featured in the issue of L'Uomo Vogue (Italian Vogue), and Fashion TV filmed a behind the scenes look at the shoot in Toronto. Münter spent three years as a special correspondent for NASCAR.com and was one of three "Hostess Race Divas" to appear on boxes of Hostess Twinkies and Cupcakes alongside IndyCar's Danica Patrick and drag racing's Melanie Troxel. In 2008, she did a live interview with NPR about her green efforts in racing. Leilani did a live television interview from the BP Oil Spill in the Gulf of Mexico with MSNBC. She was also featured on the front page of CNN.com in 2010. In 2012, she was featured in AOL's "You've Got" web series. In 2012, Oprah Winfrey ran a feature on Münter in both her magazine and her online blog.

She once worked as a stand-in photo double for Catherine Zeta-Jones.

=== Documentary film ===
Münter is a volunteer for Ric O'Barry and his non-profit organization Ric O'Barry's Dolphin Project. Ric O'Barry was featured in the Academy Award-winning film The Cove (film) and Münter began working for Ric after seeing the film. This led to Münter participating in the next Oceanic Preservation Society film, the 2015 documentary Racing Extinction which made its debut at the Sundance Film Festival in January 2015 and was then picked up by The Discovery Channel. Münter drives a specialized version of the Tesla Model S in Racing Extinction which is equipped with a 15,000 lumen projector, a high definition FLIR camera (forward looking infra red) that comes out of the "frunk" of the car which has a special color filter on it that makes CO_{2} and methane visible to the human eye. It is also the first car in the world with electro-luminescent paint. In September 2014 Oceanic Preservation Society did a public projection at the United Nations in New York City to raise awareness about the "Anthropocene" or sixth mass extinction.

== Activism ==
=== Environmental activism ===
Münter is well known for speaking on environmental issues. She blogs in the green section of the Huffington Post and became the first Ambassador for the National Wildlife Federation in 2008 and went to Capitol Hill to lobby for environmental legislation. In 2010, she was named by Discovery Channel's Planet Green Network as the #1 Eco Athlete in the world, beating out Lance Armstrong for the top spot. She was also featured in a series called Fast Forward on Planet Green Network, which highlights environmental heroes. Glamour Magazine named her one of their "Eco Heroes."

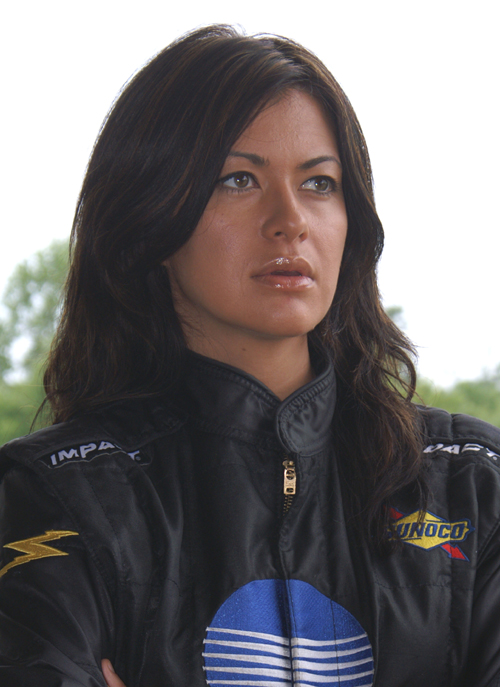
Münter in 2007

In March 2008, Münter went to Capitol Hill with the National Wildlife Federation to speak with members of Congress on behalf of the Climate Security Act. That summer, Münter spoke at a rally in Capitol Hill alongside Senator Barbara Boxer, Senator John Kerry, and Senator Joe Lieberman in support of the Climate Security Act.

Münter graduated from the University of California, San Diego where she earned a bachelor's degree in Biology specializing in Ecology, Behavior, and Evolution. She is also a long time vegetarian.

In February 2009 Münter climbed to the top of a wind turbine at Horse Hollow Wind Energy Center in Abilene, Texas and autographed one of the blades. The turbine was consequently nicknamed "Leilani" by its owner, NextEra Energy Resources. Later that same year, Münter signed a solar panel at NextEra Energy's SEGS in the Mojave Desert, the largest solar thermal energy center in the world. Also in 2009 Münter met musician Jack Johnson, who later that same year gave Münter permission to use his music with her slideshow about her mission to bring environmental awareness to the racing world.

In May 2009 Münter went to Norway to participate in the zero-emission Viking Rally, driving a hydrogen fuel cell-powered Ford Focus. Münter finished second in the hill-climb, just behind World Rally driver Hennig Solberg. Münter drank the water from the exhaust of the vehicle at the 24th annual Electric, Fuel Cell and Hybrid Vehicle Symposium and Exhibition in Stavanger, Norway. She was also featured in the new TV series Fast Forward on Planet Green, which profiled her environmental efforts in racing.

Münter was one of the first celebrity activists to visit the BP Oil Spill; she arrived in Venice, Louisiana on May 2, ten days after the Deepwater Horizon sank to the bottom of the Gulf of Mexico, the same day President Barack Obama arrived. She spent a week at the spill, documenting her experience there. On July 13, 2010, Münter returned and toured areas of Louisiana affected by the BP Oil Spill as part of a Sierra Club sponsored event involving 10 current and former athletes which included tennis star Chanda Rubin, Olympic skier Stacey Cook and NFL stars Ovie Mughelli and Mike Alstott.

The Environmental Protection Agency tapped Leilani to record a "Pick 5 for the Environment" public service announcement in 2010.

In 2013, she purchased an electric Tesla Model S car, became an advocate for electric cars, and wrote a blog post for the Huffington Post titled "Why We Need to Fight for Tesla" in response to state legislators introducing a bill to ban Tesla sales in North Carolina. She also wrote an article in 2014 about the media attention around Tesla fires. Münter delivered a speech at the first annual TESLIVE gathering of Tesla owners in Milpitas, California, receiving a standing ovation from the audience, including Tesla Motors CEO Elon Musk.

=== Animal activism ===
In 2010, Münter became involved in protests against the hunting of dolphins in Taiji, Japan and became a volunteer for Save Japan Dolphins. On September 2, 2010, Münter visited Tokyo with dolphin activist Ric O'Barry to deliver a petition asking for the hunting of dolphins to be stopped. She returned to Taiji, Japan again for two weeks in October 2010 and documented two dolphin hunts while she was there. Münter recorded a video from Taiji for the project One Day on Earth on October 10, 2010. She returned to Taiji in September 2011 with O'Barry; the effects of Typhoon Talas led her to report on Huffington Post that she understood water stress issues around the world in a much deeper way than before. She recorded the first dolphin hunt of the 2011/2012 hunting season on September 7, 2011.

On January 3, 2012, Münter announced that she was raising funds to drive a "The Cove" themed race car at Daytona International Speedway on February 18 to draw attention to dolphin captivity and killings. Her left rear tire blew early in the race and she wrote about the event on the Huffington Post. In April 2012, she spoke on the National Mall in Washington DC on Earth Day. She was also featured on MSN Causes on Earth Day 2012.

In 2014, Münter began driving a race car modeled after an orca whale at the Talladega Speedway with a Blackfish theme to raise awareness about the controversial 2013 documentary criticizing Seaworld for placing orca whales in captivity. She raised $7,500 for the car through crowd-funding and had the remaining $107,500 given to her by The Simpsons co-creator Sam Simon, who was also an animal rights activist. During the autograph signing at the race, Münter passed out more than 100 copies of Blackfish DVDs.

== Personal life ==
On March 17, 2009, Münter married Craig Davidson, an engineer, in a seaside wedding on New Zealand's Cathedral Cove beach. Her personal car is an electric Tesla Model S, which she charges with solar panels on the roof of her home.

Münter identifies herself as being childfree: a position she largely owes to helping greatly reduce her ecological impact on the planet. She further believes that the decision to refrain from having any children must be normalized in order to deal with human overpopulation. She is also a patron of Population Matters in order to spread awareness regarding the issue.

Münter is the sister-in-law of musician Bob Weir, one of the founding members of the Grateful Dead.

== Motorsports career results ==
=== American open–wheel racing results ===
(key)

==== Indy Pro Series ====
Year	Team	1	2	3	4	5	6	7	8	9	10	11	12	13	14	15	16	Rank	Points
2007	Sam Schmidt Motorsports	HMS	STP1	STP2	INDY	MIL	IMS1	IMS2	IOW	WGL1	WGL2	NSH	MOH	KTY; 16	SNM1	SNM2	CHI; 13	33rd	31

=== ARCA Menards Series ===
(key) (Bold – Pole position awarded by qualifying time. Italics – Pole position earned by points standings or practice time. * – Most laps led.)

ARCA Menards Series results
Year	Team	No.	Make	1	2	3	4	5	6	7	8	9	10	11	12	13	14	15	16	17	18	19	20	AMSC	Pts	Ref
2010	Mark Gibson Racing	59	Dodge	DAY; 39	PBE	SLM	TEX	TAL	TOL	POC	MCH	IOW	MFD	POC	BLN	NJE	ISF	CHI	DSF	TOL	SLM	KAN; 35	CAR	121st	90	
2012	Tony Marks Racing	12	Dodge	DAY; 36	MOB	SLM	TAL	TOL	ELK	POC	MCH	WIN	NJE	IOW	CHI	IRP	POC	BLN	ISF	MAD	SLM	DSF	KAN	146th	50	
2014	Venturini Motorsports	55	Toyota	DAY; 28	MOB	SLM	TAL; 14	TOL	NJE	POC	MCH	ELK	WIN											38th	590	
2014	Venturini Motorsports	66	Toyota											CHI; 12	IRP	POC	BLN	ISF	MAD	DSF	SLM	KEN	KAN; 12	38th	590	
2015	Venturini Motorsports	66	Toyota	DAY; 38	MOB	NSH	SLM	TAL	TOL	NJE	POC	MCH	CHI	WIN	IOW	IRP	POC	BLN	ISF	DSF	SLM	KEN	KAN	137th	40	
2017	Venturini Motorsports	15	Toyota	DAY; 19	NSH	SLM																		75th	225	
2017	Venturini Motorsports	98	Chevy				TAL; 28	TOL	ELK	POC	MCH	MAD	IOW	IRP	POC	WIN	ISF	ROA	DSF	SLM	CHI	KEN	KAN	75th	225	
2018	Venturini Motorsports	20	Toyota	DAY; 8	NSH	SLM	TAL; 22	TOL	CLT; 20	POC; 22	MCH; 9	MAD	GTW	CHI; 20	IOW	ELK	POC; 20	ISF	BLN	DSF	SLM	IRP	KAN; 14	20th	1225	
2019	Venturini Motorsports	55	Toyota	DAY; 15	FIF	SLM	TAL	NSH	TOL	CLT	POC	MCH	MAD	GTW	CHI	ELK	IOW	POC	ISF	DSF	SLM	IRP	KAN	67th	155	

^{*} Season still in progress
^{1} Ineligible for series points
