= Taiji dolphin drive hunt =

Annual event in Taiji, Wakayama Prefecture, Japan

Coordinates: 33.599329°N 135.946498°E

- Type of hunt: Dolphin drive hunt
- Based in: Taiji
- Country: Japan
- Country size: 1820 drive-hunting catch

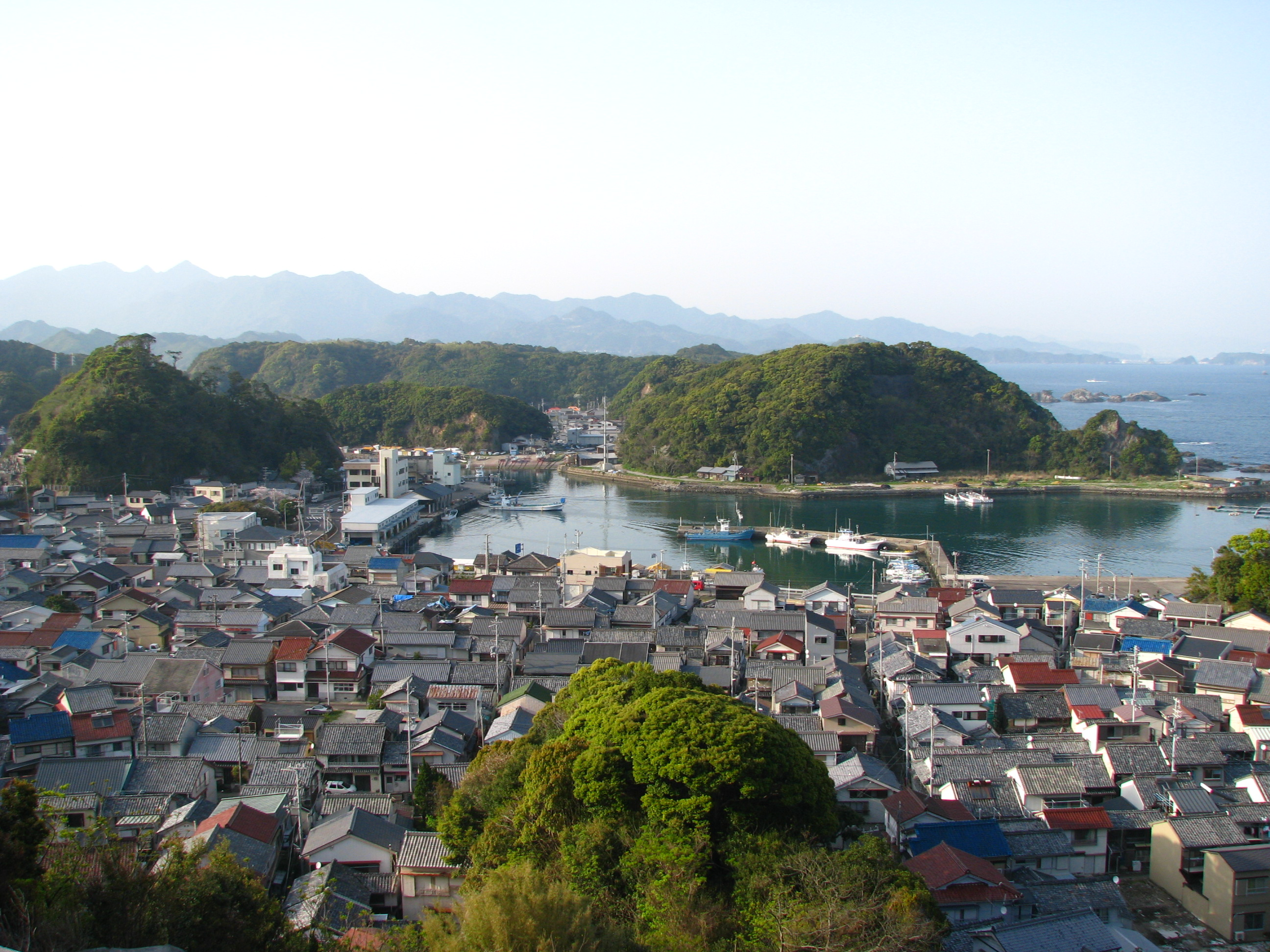
The fishing village of Taiji

The Taiji dolphin drive hunt is based on driving dolphins and other small cetaceans into a small bay where they can be killed or captured for their meat and for sale to dolphinariums. The new primary killing method is done by cutting the spinal cord of the dolphin, a method that claims to decrease the mammal's time to death. Taiji has a long connection to whaling in Japan. The 2009 documentary film The Cove drew international attention to the hunt. Taiji is the only town in Japan where drive hunting still takes place on a large scale.

The number of dolphins available for catch in FY2023 set by the Fisheries Agency was 10,920 for Japan as a whole, and the number of dolphins available for catch allocated to the Taiji dolphin drive hunt was 1824. Of these, the actual number of dolphins caught in Japan as a whole was 614, compared to 492 in the Taiji dolphin hunt. The largest quota for dolphin hunting in Japan is the harpooning of Dall's porpoise and True's porpoise in Iwate Prefecture, where 3313 Dall's porpoises and 4336 True's porpoises were authorized to be caught in FY2023. However, only 109 True's porpoises were actually caught.

A majority of international concern is on the hunting method, which is viewed as inhumane. An article by National Geographic refers to The Japanese Association of Zoos and Aquariums' decision to no longer support the Taiji hunt. In 2015, it was announced that there would be a ban in the buying and selling of dolphins through the means of this hunt.

== Context and history ==
There is a long history of whaling in Japan. Residents of Taiji have been refining whaling techniques ever since Wada Chūbei Yorimoto (和田忠兵衛頼元) began the first commercial operations in Japan in 1606. Initially, whales were taken by means of hand harpoons and small boats. After nets were introduced into whaling in 1675, the industry spread throughout Japan.

Dolphin drive hunting, in which small cetaceans are herded towards the land, exists as a form of aboriginal whaling in coastal communities around the world, from the Faroe Islands to the Solomon Islands. It has been practiced in various parts of Japan as well, but Taiji is the only substantial hunt that remains. The hunts are argued to be a part of Japanese culture.

== Species and numbers ==
=== Drive hunt ===
Nine species of dolphins, listed in the table below, were caught in the Taiji dolphin drive hunt from FY2010 to FY2022. The hunting season ran from September to the following August.

FY2010-FY2022 Taiji Dolphin Drive Hunt Results
Species	Quota (2019/2020/2021/2022)	2010	2011	2012	2013	2014	2015	2016	2017	2018	2019	2020	2021	2022
Short-finned pilot whale	134/101/101/101	0	74	172	88	41	80	41	57	0	63	14	45	13
Striped	450/450/450/450	458	406	508	498	367	353	625	299	435	343	373	265	178
Bottlenose	298/298/298/298	395	76	186	190	172	181	147	127	97	133	135	56	70
Risso's	251/251/251/251	271	273	188	298	260	211	232	118	227	191	167	171	159
Pantropical spotted	280/280/280/280	125	106	98	126	145	59	20	17	0	18	76	0	0
False killer whale	70/70/70/49	0	17	0	0	0	0	0	0	0	0	0	0	0
Pacific white sided	100/100/100/100	27	24	2	39	5	7	6	21	19	8	15	13	0
Rough-toothed	20/20/20/20	0	0	0	0	0	0	0	27	6	15	0	0	0
Melon-headed whale	300/300/300/300	0	0	0	0	0	0	0	156	110	203	230	67	148
Total	1.903/1,870/1,870/1,849	1,276	976	1,154	1,239	990	911	1,071	822	894	974	1,010	617	568

=== Harpooning hunt ===
Five species of dolphins, listed in the table below, were caught in the Taiji dolphin harpooning hunt from FY2010 to FY2022. The hunting season ran from September to the following August.

FY2010-FY2022 Taiji Dolphin Harpooning Hunt Results
Species	Quota (2019-2022)	2010	2011	2012	2013	2014	2015	2016	2017	2018	2019	2020	2021	2022
Risso's	147	126	104	52	38	103	13	1	7	0	0	0	0	0
Striped	71	100	96	94	67	63	22	10	18	1	0	0	0	0
Bottlenose	47	38	40	73	68	35	43	11	47	12	24	3	5	0
Pantropical spotted	49	7	2	12	4	18	0	2	27	0	0	0	0	0
Pacific white sided	26	0	0	2	0	0	0	0	0	0	0	0	0	0
Melon-headed whale	21	0	0	0	0	0	0	0	0	0	0	0	0	0
Total	361	271	242	233	177	219	78	24	99	13	24	3	5	0

== The initial drive ==
In Japan, the hunting is done by a select group of fishermen. When a pod of dolphins has been spotted, fishing boats move into position. One end of a steel pipe is lowered into the water, and the fisherman aboard the boats strike the pipe with mallets. This is done at strategic points around the pod, in an effort to herd them toward land. The clamor disrupts the dolphins' sonar throwing off their navigation and herds them towards the bay which leads to a sheltered cove. There, the fishermen quickly close off the area with nets to prevent the dolphins' escape. As the dolphins are initially quite agitated, they are left to calm down over night. The following day, fishermen enter the bay in small boats, and the dolphins are caught one at a time. Some are selected for live capture and are sold to dolphinariums. Others are slaughtered for their meat. Many protesters object to both uses.

== Method of slaughter ==
The killing of the animals had been done by slitting their throats, but the Japanese government banned this method and now dolphins may officially only be killed by driving a metal pin into the neck of the dolphin, which causes them to die within seconds according to a memo from Senzo Uchida, the executive secretary of the Japan Cetacean Conference on Zoological Gardens and Aquariums. A veterinary team's analysis of 2011 video footage of Japanese hunters killing striped dolphins using this method suggested that in one case death took over four minutes.

== Live capture ==
A few dolphins from each hunt may be selected for captivity and sold to marine parks around the world. In May 2015, the World Association of Zoos and Aquariums (WAZA) banned the sale and transfer of captive dolphins from Taiji, Japan. Dolphins are sold to marine parks and swimming with dolphins resorts that do not belong to WAZA.

Occasionally, some of the captured dolphins are left alive and taken to mainly, but not exclusively, Japanese dolphinariums. Prior to the practice being banned in 1993, dolphins were exported to the United States to several parks.

The US National Marine Fisheries Service has refused a permit for Marine World Africa USA on one occasion to import four false killer whales caught in a Japanese drive hunt. In recent years, dolphins from the Japanese drive hunts have been exported to China, Taiwan and to Egypt. On multiple occasions, members of the International Marine Animal Trainers Association (IMATA) have also been observed at the drive hunts in Japan.

Captive dolphins are now sold to aquariums and swim programs all over the world. The animals that are captured often die within days due to shock and injury, many during transport. The rest will live in captivity. Those in accredited facilities can have a lifespan comparable to what they would likely experience in the wild.

=== Taiji Twelve ===
The Taiji Twelve is a term used by anti-dolphin hunting campaigners to describe a group of dolphins captured in a dolphin drive hunt outside of the town of Taiji, Wakayama, Japan in October 2006. The Ocean World Adventure Park in the Dominican Republic had placed an order for twelve dolphins for the captive swim program.

Although most of the dolphins captured were earmarked for export, a coalition headed by the Japan Dolphins Coalition's marine-mammal specialist Richard O'Barry, with Earth Island Institute, tried to block their export to the Dominican Republic. The exportation was eventually canceled.

== Health risks ==
The meat and blubber of the dolphins caught has been found to have high levels of mercury, cadmium, the pesticide DDT, and organic contaminants like PCBs. The Japanese Ministry of Health issued warnings on the consumption of some species of fish, whale, and dolphin since 2003. It recommends that children and pregnant women avoid eating them on a regular basis. Because of the health concerns, the price of dolphin meat decreased significantly in 2006.

In June 2008, Aera, a Japanese weekly journal, reported that the whale and dolphin meat sold in Taiji contained 160 times higher levels of mercury, and hairs from eight men and women had 40 times higher levels, based on a research conducted by the National Institute for Minamata Disease (NIMD). The NIMD published the full data of the research online a few days later. It has been pointed out that the amount of methyl-mercury, which causes neurological damage, was not exceedingly high, and the mercury in hair showed rapid decrease since tests carried out by other institutions a few months ago to the same people. The NIMD agreed to help monitor the health of Taiji residents.

In 2010, hair samples from 1,137 Taiji residents were tested for mercury by the National Institute for Minamata Disease. The average amount of methyl mercury found in the hair samples was 11.0 parts per million for men and 6.63 ppm for women, compared with an average of 2.47 ppm for men and 1.64 ppm for women in tests conducted in 14 other locations in Japan. One hundred eighty-two Taiji residents showing extremely high mercury levels underwent further medical testing to check for symptoms of mercury poisoning. None of the Taiji residents displayed any of the traditional symptoms of mercury poisoning, according to the Institute.

The chief of the NIMD, Koji Okamoto, said, "We presume that the high mercury concentrations are due to the intake of dolphin and whale meat. There were not any particular cases of damaged health, but seeing as how there were some especially high concentration levels found, we would like to continue conducting surveys here." Despite the claim made by Boyd Harnell, the special correspondent to The Japan Times, that the mortality rate for Taiji and nearby Koazagawa, where dolphin meat is also consumed, is "over 50% higher than the rate for similarly-sized villages throughout Japan" using data from Japan's National Institute of Population and Social Security Research, it was revealed that the comparison was not suitable due to the huge gap in the villages' age profile. While Taiji and Kozagawa showed 34.9 percent and 44 percent of the population were over 65 years old, the compared villages showed 21 percent to 27.9 percent.

In May 2012, NIMD announced the results of further tests. In 2010 and 2011, 700 Taiji residents were tested for mercury in their hair, and 117 males and 77 females who exhibited 10 ppm underwent further neurological tests. Again, no participant displayed any signs of mercury poisoning. In August 2012, the research project to investigate the health effects of mercury on children was launched by NIMD.

Due to its low food self-sufficiency rate, around 40%, Japan relies on stockpiling to secure a stable food supply. As of 2009, Japan's 1.2 million ton seafood stockpile included nearly 5000 tons of whale meat. Japan has started to serve whale meat in school lunches as part of a government initiative to reduce the amounts. However, there has been criticism of serving whale meat to school children due to allegations of toxic mercury levels.

Consequently, Taiji's bid to expand their school lunch programs to include dolphin and whale meat brought about much controversy. An estimated 150 kilograms (330 lb) of dolphin meat was served in Taiji school lunches in 2006. In 2009, dolphin meat was taken off school menus because of the contamination. The levels of mercury and methylmercury taken from samples of dolphin and whale meat sold at supermarkets most likely to be providing the schools' lunch programs was 10 times that advised by the Japanese Health Ministry. The mercury levels were so high that the Okuwa Co. supermarket chain in Japan permanently removed dolphin meat from its shelves.

== International objections ==
The hunting of small cetaceans in Japan is known worldwide, although parallels the fact that there are still many Japanese people who know little to nothing that these hunts are taking place so close to them. Environmental and animal rights groups have raised objections to the Taiji dolphin hunt on a variety of grounds, not just for animal cruelty reasons, but for health risks posed by consumption of the dolphin and whale meat.

Anti-whaling groups such as Sea Shepherd and Greenpeace insist that whaling is cruel and should be regulated. The Prefectural Government, through publicly issued statements, emphasize that whale and dolphin hunting are a traditional form of livelihood in Japan, and that, like other animals, whales and dolphins are killed to supply the demand for meat. They maintain that methods of killing have become more humane in recent years.

=== Early activism ===
Hardy Jones, who founded BlueVoice.org with actor Ted Danson in 2000, has gone to Taiji numerous times to try to stop the capture of dolphins and small whales. His film The Dolphin Defender, produced by the PBS series Nature, documents these events. A series of exposés on the Taiji slaughter had been running in the Japan Times since 2005, and journalist Boyd Harnell has gained two Genesis Awards from The Humane Society of the United States in recognition.

Protests and campaigns are now common in Taiji. In 2003, two activists were arrested for cutting fishing nets to release captured dolphins. They were detained for 23 days. In 2007, American actress Hayden Panettiere was involved in a confrontation with Japanese fishermen as she tried to disrupt the hunt. She paddled out on a surfboard, with five other surfers from Australia and the United States, in an attempt to reach a pod of dolphins that had been captured. The following confrontation lasted more than 10 minutes before the surfers were forced to return to the beach. The surfers drove straight to Osaka airport and left the country to avoid being arrested for trespassing by the Japanese police.

Taiji's fishery cooperative union argues that these protesters "continue willfully to distort the facts about this fishery" and that protester's agendas are "based neither on international law nor on science but rather on emotion for economic self-interest." Some of the animal welfare organizations campaigning against the drive hunts are Ric O'Barry's Dolphin Project, Sea Shepherd Conservation Society, One Voice, Blue Voice, the Whale and Dolphin Conservation Society, and World Animal Protection.

In 2007, Taiji wanted to step up its dolphin hunting programs, approving an estimated ¥330 million for the construction of a massive cetacean slaughterhouse in an effort to popularize the consumption of dolphins in the country.

An increase in criticism and the considerable toxicity of the meat appears to be achieving the opposite. During the first hunt of the season in Taiji in 2009, an estimated 50 pilot whales and 100 bottlenose dolphins were captured. Although all the pilot whales were killed, and 30 bottlenose dolphins were taken for use in dolphinariums, the 70 remaining animals were set free again instead of being killed for consumption.

==== Imagery ====
Because much of the criticism is the result of photos and videos taken during the hunt and slaughter, it is now common for the final capture and slaughter to take place on site inside a tent or under a plastic cover, out of public view.

The most circulated footage is probably that of the drive and subsequent capture and slaughter process taken in Futo in October 1999, shot by the Japanese animal welfare organization Elsa Nature Conservancy. Part of this footage was, among others, shown on CNN. In recent years, the video has also become widespread on the Internet and was featured in the animal welfare documentary Earthlings, though the method of killing dolphins as shown in this video is now officially banned. Photographs from Iki Island were shot in 1979 of a Japanese fisherman stabbing dolphins to death with spears in shallow water.

=== The Cove ===
A full-length documentary film was released in 2009. The Cove (formerly The Rising) was secretly recorded over five years with high-tech video and sound equipment, funded by billionaire James H. Clark. It shows controversial dolphin killing techniques and documents how the disclosure of the high mercury level prompted two local assemblymen in Taiji to break ranks and speak publicly of health risks. But the 2,000 ppm mercury level in dolphin meat that the film gives at one point has drawn criticism for overstating the data on the mercury poisoning hazard. The film claims concentration of 2,000 ppm mercury in dolphin meat, but measurements taken in 2008 range from 0.11 ppm to 64.6 ppm total mercury, the latter corresponding to about 162 times the health ministry's advisory level. The film, which was shown at Sundance Film Festival, won the Academy Award for Best Documentary Feature in 2010.

==== Behind The Cove ====
Behind The Cove offers a rebuttal. This film takes the perspective of the Taiji fishermen, including footage of interviews from Japanese whaling officials, allowing them to tell their side of the story. Keiko Yagi is the creator of this film, with the argument that people must respect each other's food culture, and that cetacean meat has been lean meat provided for years in Japanese culture.

Others have argued that this film is questionable, because of its interviews with past whalers, rather than the perspective of concurrent dolphin hunters, or the people engaged in the business of buying and selling small cetaceans for marine park businesses and entertainment.

=== Recent activism ===
Since the release of the film, a larger number of activists, mainly non-Japanese, have visited Taiji to protest or film the dolphin hunts. The activists observe and monitor the hunting throughout the hunting season from September until it ends in April. The Taiji fishermen responded by constructing an elaborate structure of tarps to better conceal the drive-hunting activities in and around the cove.

Activists report that they have been harassed when trying to document the hunts by local supporters of the dolphin fishermen. Although the culling cove is adjacent to Yoshino Kumano Kokuritsu Koen (Yoshino-Kumano National Park), the park is often sealed to visitors by the police during the hunts. In 2011, a police box staffed with 10 policemen was placed near the cove to prevent conflict between the protesters and the fishermen.

In 2014, Prime Minister Shinzo Abe asked for understanding of Japanese dolphin hunting, responding to U.S. Ambassador Caroline Kennedy. He said "The dolphin hunting is an ancient practice rooted in their culture and supports their livelihood. In every country and region, there are practices and ways of living and culture that have been handed down from ancestors. Naturally, I feel that they should be respected.".

In 2014 a non-profit organization called Australia for Dolphins (featured in the documentary The Cove) launched a world-first lawsuit against the brokers of the drive hunts, the Taiji Whale Museum. The lawsuit, known as the Action for Angel case, alleges that the museum illegally refused entry to dolphin welfare observers, and aims to open the museum up to public scrutiny. In March 2016, the Court ruled in favor of Australia for Dolphins and awarded 110,000 Yen to AFD reaffirming that the museum acted illegally in refusing entrance to Sarah Lucas.

The ongoing question as to whether or not the Japanese will ban the hunt on Taiji dolphins is still questionable. In May 2015, a vote had taken place in order to stop the buying and selling of Taiji dolphins in Japan after being made infamous in the documentary, The Cove. The international group World Association of Zoos and Aquariums opposes these drive hunts, and their statement to end these hunts is a huge message from within the industry; however, this message may not be enough to affect the drive hunts.

In February 2019, the London-based organization Action for Dolphins and the Japanese NGO Life Investigation Agency filed a lawsuit against Wakayama prefecture governor Yoshinobu Nisaka, for allegedly issuing permits to hunters who violate animal welfare laws and catch quotas. The lawsuit also asserted that the current drive hunt practice violates Japanese laws, as dolphins are often incorrectly legally classified as fish instead of mammals. In May, a Japanese resident of Taiji testified in court, contending that the hunters regularly exceed the government-stipulated quotas and infringe on animal welfare laws, noting the method of hunting as "exceptionally cruel". Regardless, in September the annual drive hunt had resumed.

==== Focus on buyers ====
Activist Ric O'Barry, whose work on these dolphin drive hunts has been prominently featured in The Cove, says that his plans to continue his efforts to end these hunts completely will start through international protests at Japanese embassies and consulates worldwide on the day the next hunting season begins in September. The next focus will be on who is capturing the dolphins, and the reaction and responding from the World Association of Zoos and Aquariums and the Japanese Association of Zoos and Aquariums about dolphins obtained outside of Taiji.

The problem now is that even though all of the 63 member aquariums and 89 zoos of the Japanese group stop purchasing dolphins, they are still able to be sold and purchased outside of Japan through overseas aquariums; Taiji also owns its own aquarium.

== See also ==
- Dolphin meat in Japanese cuisine
- Whaling in Japan
- Animal welfare and rights in Japan
- Whaling in the Faroe Islands
