= Racing Extinction =

2015 documentary film

- Theatrical release poster
- Directed by: Louie Psihoyos
- Written by: Mark Monroe
- Produced by: Fisher Stevens; Olivia Ahnemann
- Cinematography: John Behrens; Shawn Heinrichs; Sean Kirby; Petr Stepanek
- Edited by: Geoffrey Richman; Lyman Smith; Jason Zeldes
- Music by: J. Ralph
- Production companies: Discovery Channel; Abramorama; Oceanic Preservation Society; Okeanos; Vulcan Productions; Diamond Docs; Insurgent Media
- Distributed by: Abramorama
- Release date: January 24, 2015 (Sundance Film Festival)
- Running time: 94 minutes
- Country: United States
- Language: English

Racing Extinction is a 2015 documentary about the ongoing anthropogenic mass extinction of species and the efforts from scientists, activists, and journalists to document it by Oscar-winning director Louie Psihoyos, who directed the documentary The Cove (2009). The film received one Oscar nomination, for Best Original Song, and one Emmy nomination for Exceptional Merit in Documentary Filmmaking. Racing Extinction premiered at the 2015 Sundance Film Festival, followed by limited theater release, with worldwide broadcast premiere on Discovery Channel in 220 countries or territories on December 2, 2015.

Racing Extinction′s website details further information about contemporary extinction and campaigns with which to prevent it. The film was created by the Oceanic Preservation Society.

== Synopsis ==
The film deals with several examples of the overarching theme of the Anthropocene Extinction, in that the spread of Homo sapiens has caused the greatest mass extinction since the KT event 66 million years ago, including climate change and poaching, and the efforts of scientists, photographers, and volunteers to protect endangered species. The film implicates human overpopulation, globalization, and animal agriculture as leading causes of extinction.

The film deals with the illegal wildlife trade, including the filmmakers exposing a whale meat restaurant in the US (on the same day Louie Psihoyos was originally planning to collect his Academy Award for The Cove) and covert undercover investigations of the shark fin and Manta ray gill trade in Hong Kong and mainland China for traditional medicines. The film also documents successful efforts to include manta rays on the CITES Appendix II list of protected species, thus stopping the village of Lamakera on Solor in Indonesia from killing them to supply demand in China.

The film refers to the Baiji and the Hawaiʻi ʻōʻō as recent examples of extinction (although both of these species are still believed by some to be extant), and identifies the Amphibian extinction crisis, the overfishing of sharks for shark fin soup and as bycatch, among others, as current causes for concern. More specific examples include the imminent extinction of the Florida grasshopper sparrow and Rabb's fringe-limbed treefrog (the last individual of which, Toughie, and Joel Sartore photographs).

Anthropogenic climate change from greenhouse gas emissions is identified as a leading cause of extinction, as organisms cannot adapt to unprecedented changes in not only temperature but weather, ocean chemistry, and atmospheric composition. The film focuses on the amount of methane produced by livestock, particularly cattle, and trapped methane escaping from frozen reservoirs in the Arctic, the latter drawing parallels to the runaway greenhouse effect that may have caused the Permian mass extinction that wiped out 95% of species. Carbon dioxide and methane emissions from transportation, animals, and factories are made visible to the human eye for the first time with a specially designed high-definition FLIR (forward-looking infrared) camera, with a special color filter. Ocean acidification and the subsequent degradation of corals and other calcium carbonate-based marine organisms are revealed with lab experiments and comparisons of archived photographs to the state of the same reefs in the 2010s. The degradation of marine ecosystems and the implications of coastal habitation are highlighted.

The filmmakers also work with Obscura Digital to design a custom Tesla Model S fitted with a 15,000-lumen projector system to project images of critically endangered and extinct species onto public buildings including Shell factories, Wall Street, Headquarters of the United Nations, the Empire State Building and the Vatican. They go visit the village of Lamakera, Indonesia to convince the village to stop fishing manta rays. As well as the greenhouse gas camera previously mentioned and the projector, it is also the first car in the world with electro-luminescent paint, inspired by bioluminescent organisms, and projects endangered animal sounds from the Bioacoustics Research Program. This campaign aimed to raise awareness and encourage people to change habits to ensure the survival of species for future generations, further highlighted by the 'Start With One Thing' Campaign.

== Cast ==
Several notable persons had an appearance in this film, including:

- Elon Musk of Tesla Motors
- National Geographic photographer Joel Sartore, founder of The Photo Ark project
- Primatologist Jane Goodall
- Author and columnist Elizabeth Kolbert
- Professor Stuart Pimm
- Christopher W. Clark (director of the Bioacoustics Research Program (BRP))
- Race car driver and environmentalist Leilani Münter
- Artist Shawn Heinrichs
- Conservationist and Photographer Paul Hilton

Obscura Digital customized the Tesla Model S car used for the projections.

== Reception ==
Racing Extinction was generally acclaimed by critics. The film has been nominated for an Emmy Award for Exceptional Merit in Documentary Filmmaking. The film holds a Metacritic score of 81/100. It was also praised as a "return to form" for the Discovery Channel, in that it represented a break from the numerous pseudoscience-based mockumentaries that the network was airing at the time. The film received the Cinema for Peace International Green Film Award in 2016.

== Soundtrack ==
Racing Extinction: Original Motion Picture Soundtrack

Soundtrack album by J. Ralph
- Released: November 6, 2015
- Length: 58:57
- Label: Rumor Mill Records

J. Ralph chronology
Meru (2014)	Racing Extinction: Original Motion Picture Soundtrack (2015)	Jim: The James Foley Story (2015)

A soundtrack was released via Rumor Mill Records on November 6, 2015. The main theme of the documentary is a song called "One Candle" featuring the vocals of Australian singer-songwriter, Sia. To promote this track, a music video was created using images of animals projected onto the side of the Empire State Building in New York.

At the 88th Academy Awards, "Manta Ray" by J. Ralph & Anohni was nominated for Best Original Song. Other nominees competing in this category were "Earned It" from Fifty Shades of Grey, "Til It Happens to You" from The Hunting Ground, "Simple Song #3" from Youth, and "Writing's on the Wall" from Spectre. "Writing's On the Wall", by Sam Smith, was the winner.

All tracks are written by J. Ralph.

Racing Extinction
No.	Title	Writer(s)	Length
1.	"One Candle"	J. Ralph; Sia	4:03
2.	"Manta Ray"	J. Ralph; Anohni	5:18
3.	"One Million Miles Away (From the Illusionary Movements of Geraldine & Nazu)"		3:55
4.	"The Whole World Is Singing"		1:15
5.	"The Hump"		1:56
6.	"Our Own Road"		1:57
7.	"The Permian"		2:31
8.	"Underwater Color"		1:51
9.	"The Hand of Man"		0:55
10.	"37 Pictures on a 36 Roll"		1:56
11.	"Move the Needle"		1:01
12.	"Burning Through the Fossil"		2:37
13.	"Endangered Amphibians"		2:19
14.	"Better Stewards"		2:37
15.	"Almost All Life"		2:09
16.	"Racing Extinction"		5:15
17.	"Grasshopper Sparrow"		1:40
18.	"The Movies"		2:32
19.	"Rings of Endangered Species"		1:29
20.	"One Note Grand Piano"		4:22
21.	"The Mesozoic"		2:38
22.	"Possibilities"		1:01
23.	"Racing Extinction (Reprise)"		3:40
Total length:			58:57

== See also ==
- Anthropocene
- Decline in amphibian populations
- Extinction risk from global warming
- Holocene extinction event
- Ocean acidification
- The Photo Ark
- The Sixth Extinction
- List of vegan and plant-based media
