= Lincoln O'Barry =

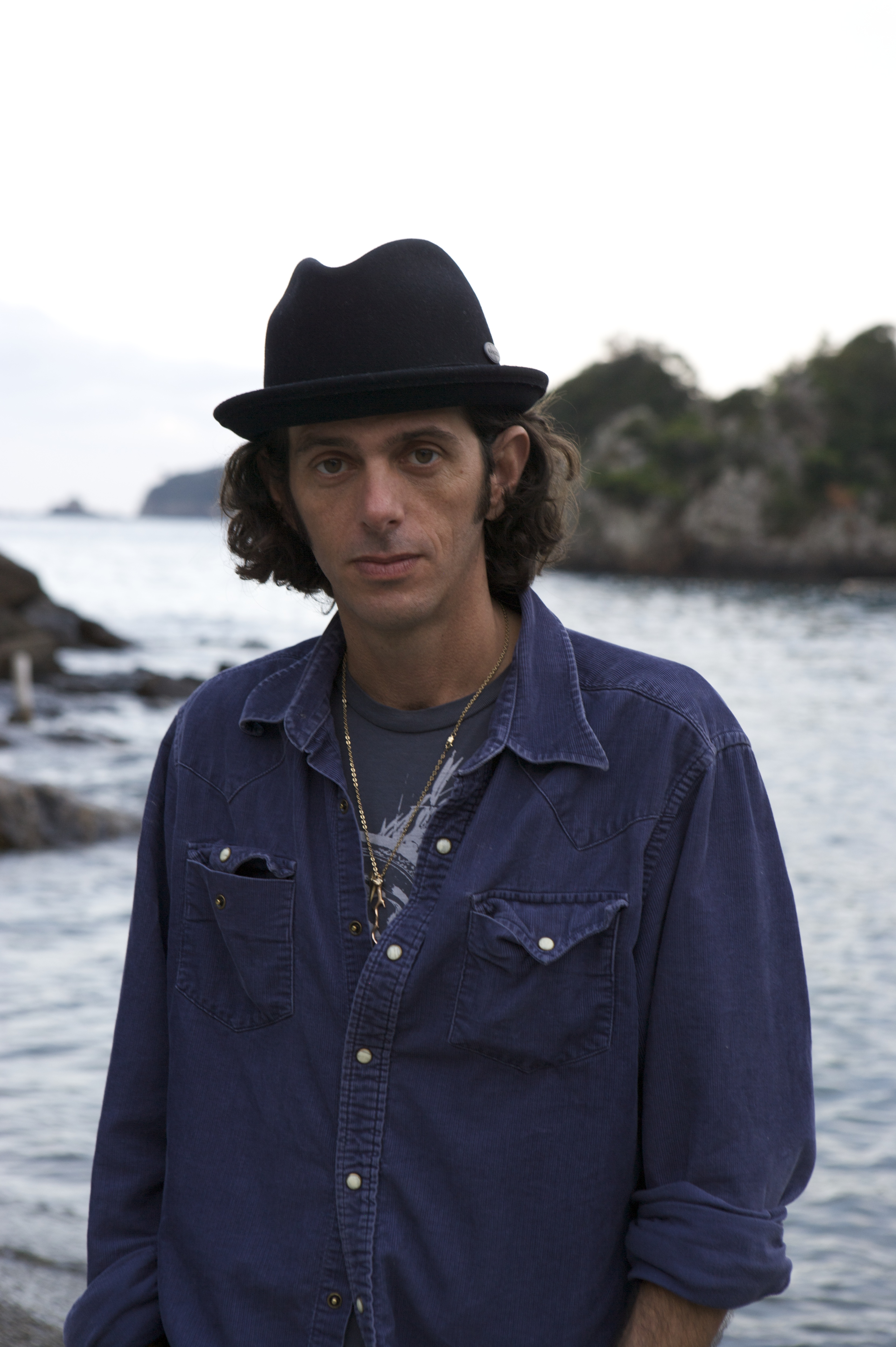
- Lincoln O'Barry at the Cove in Taiji, Japan
- Born: February 23, 1972 (age 53); Coconut Grove, Florida, U.S.
- Occupation(s): Executive Producer, Director, Documentary Filmmaker, Activist
- Father: Ric O'Barry
- Website: www.dolphinproject.net

Lincoln O'Barry (born February 23, 1972) is an American director, producer and animal rights activist. O'Barry is known for the Animal Planet series Blood Dolphins. He is the son of Ric O'Barry, former Flipper dolphin trainer.

== Personal life ==
O'Barry was born and raised in Coconut Grove, Florida, United States. His father, Ric, was the original trainer for the Flipper television series.

== Career ==
O'Barry works with his father on the re-release of captive dolphins in such places as Colombia, Egypt, Solomon Islands, Brazil, Nicaragua, Indonesia and the United States. He volunteers for The Dolphin Project, an organization that aims to free captive dolphins. Lincoln produced, directed and starred in the television mini-series Blood Dolphins. He also acted as his father's assistant on the Academy Award-winning film, The Cove.

O'Barry traveled to the remote Solomon island of Malaita, and visited the small dolphin hunting village of Bita’ama, where dolphins were hunted for their teeth and meat. He along with his father were able to negotiate an end to the 800-year-old slaughter. After viewing a YouTube video of four dolphins shipped from Taiji in a swimming pool at a home in Egypt, O'Barry went to Hurghada Egypt to rally local support and get the dolphins moved into a bigger tank. The Minister of Environment issued a statement that no more wild caught mammals would be imported into the country.

O'Barry helped design and build the first permanent dolphin rehabilitation center in Kemujan, Karimunjawa, for dolphins accidentally caught by fishermen or rescued from illegal circuses. He worked with his father and local NGO Jakarta Animal Aid Network.

== Filmography ==
- Blood Dolphins, "Return To Taiji"
- Blood Dolphins, "The Solomon's Mission"
- Blood Dolphins, "Saving the Solomons"
