= Oceanic Preservation Society =

US non-profit organization

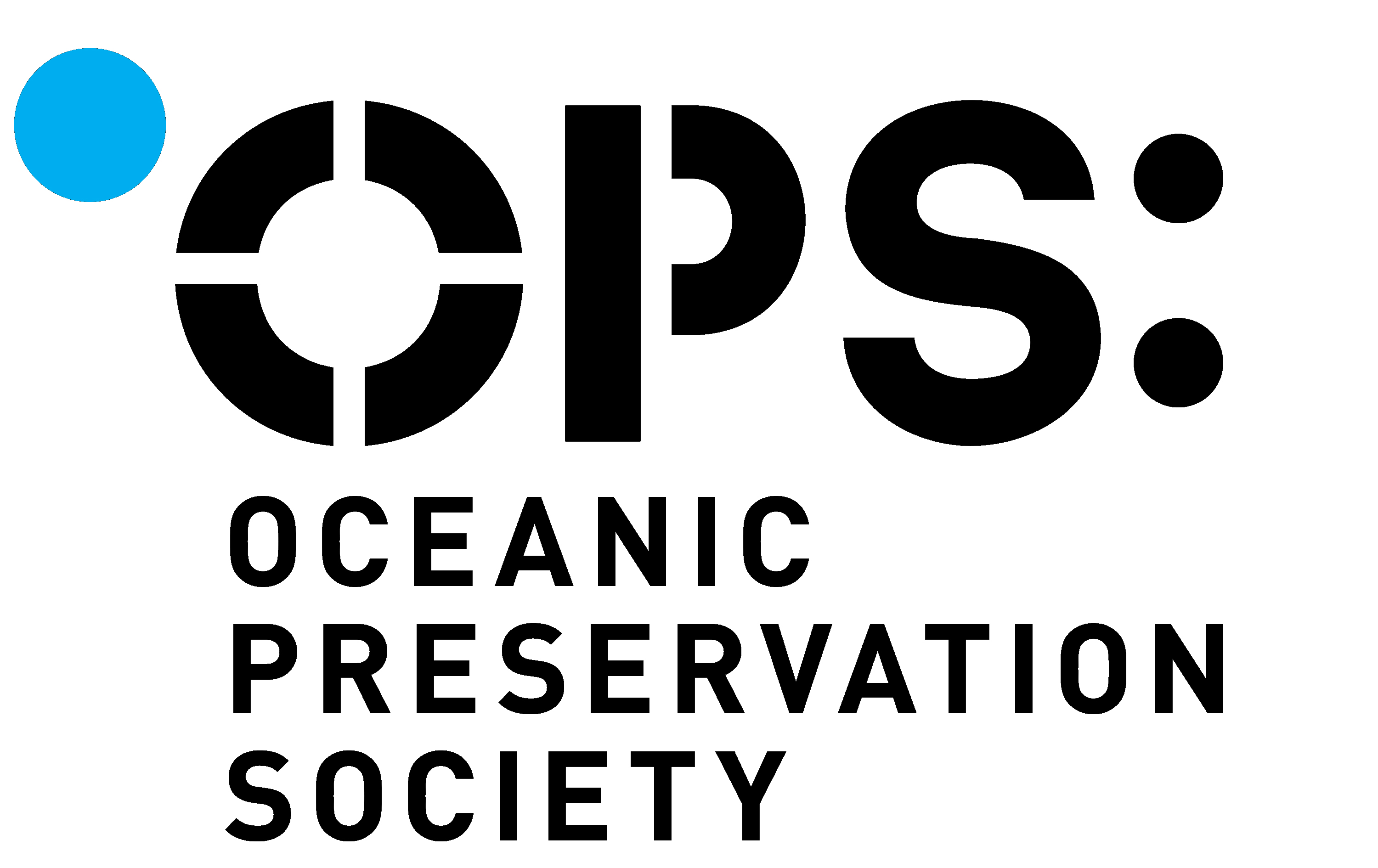
- Abbreviation: OPS
- Founded: 2005
- Purpose: Marine Conservation, Biodiversity Conservation
- Location: San Francisco, California
- Executive Director: Louie Psihoyos
- Website: opsociety.org

The Oceanic Preservation Society is a California-based 501(c)(3) non-profit organization that promotes marine conservation and environmental protection by combating complex global issues such as biodiversity loss, climate change, illegal wildlife trading, deforestation, and unsustainable fishing through documentary, film and media. It was founded in 2005 by Louie Psihoyos and Jim Clark. In 2009, OPS released The Cove, an Academy Award–winning documentary film that describes the annual mass slaughter of dolphins in a national park at Taiji, Wakayama.

The organization's second project, Emmy-nominated documentary, Racing Extinction, focuses on the mass extinction of species, disappearance of coral reefs, and the rise of toxins in the ocean.

== Filmography ==
- The Cove (2009)
- Racing Extinction (2015)
- The Game Changers (2018)
- You Are What You Eat: A Twin Experiment (2024)
