= Hardy Jones =

American filmmaker (1943–2018)

Hardy Jones (1943 – December 12, 2018) was a wildlife and conservation filmmaker. He began his career in radio at WNOE in New Orleans and worked for United Press International, The Peruvian Times, and CBS News. He had been a television documentary producer since 1978 and produced over 75 films for PBS, Discovery, TBS, and National Geographic. His first film, entitled DOLPHIN, depicts a school of spotted dolphins residing 40 miles north of Grand Bahama island. Beginning in 1978, Jones returned countless times to the Bahamas to visit these dolphins and film them. Some of the dolphins have become internationally famous. Chopper, a 27-year-old male, was filmed by Jones for the first time in 1979 and appeared in the 2005 PBS film The Dolphin Defender.

== Education ==
Jones was an alumnus (1958) of New Canaan Country School and in 2008 received the prestigious alumni award. He was a graduate of Choate and Tulane University.

== Work ==
Jones fought for nearly thirty years to stop the killing and capture of dolphins in Japan and worked on environmental issues in Peru for more than five years. He documented the mass mortality of dolphins along the coast of Peru and the massive slaughter of dolphins for use as shark bait in the longline fishery. His documentary film on this subject will be broadcast in 2017.

In 2000, Jones joined film actor and ocean activist Ted Danson and founded BlueVoice.org (a website dedicated to the protection of dolphins and whales and particularly stopping the hunting of dolphins in Japanese fishing villages). The organization uses television and the internet to publicize ocean issues. One of the group's main concerns is the alarming level of contamination in the oceans - bio-accumulating in the foodweb from plankton to fish, marine mammals, then humans.

Jones’ book, The Voice of the Dolphins, was published in 2011. It recounts more than thirty years of work with dolphins in the wild as well as the efforts of BlueVoice.org to end the killing of dolphins in Japan and the increasing menace of chemical contaminants in the marine food chain.

== Recognition ==
Among his numerous awards are 2005 Filmmaker of the Year Award from Filmmakers for Conservation, a Lifetime Achievement Award from the International Wildlife Film Festival, the Genesis Award of the Humane Society of the United States, and the Special Jury Award of the Explorers Club. He also appeared in the 2010 Academy Award winning documentary The Cove. He was the recipient of the 2016 NOGI award from the Academy of Underwater Arts and Sciences for his environmental work.

== Later life and death ==
In 2003, Jones was diagnosed with multiple myeloma, a form of blood cancer often linked to exposure to toxic chemicals such as dioxins. His recent work was researching the relationship between persistent organic pollutants to cancer and other health problems in humans and marine mammals.

Jones died on December 12, 2018, after a long battle with multiple myeloma. He is survived by his wife Deborah Cutting and his sister Betsy Jones.

== See also ==
- Taiji, Wakayama
