= Dolphin drive hunting =

Method of hunting dolphins

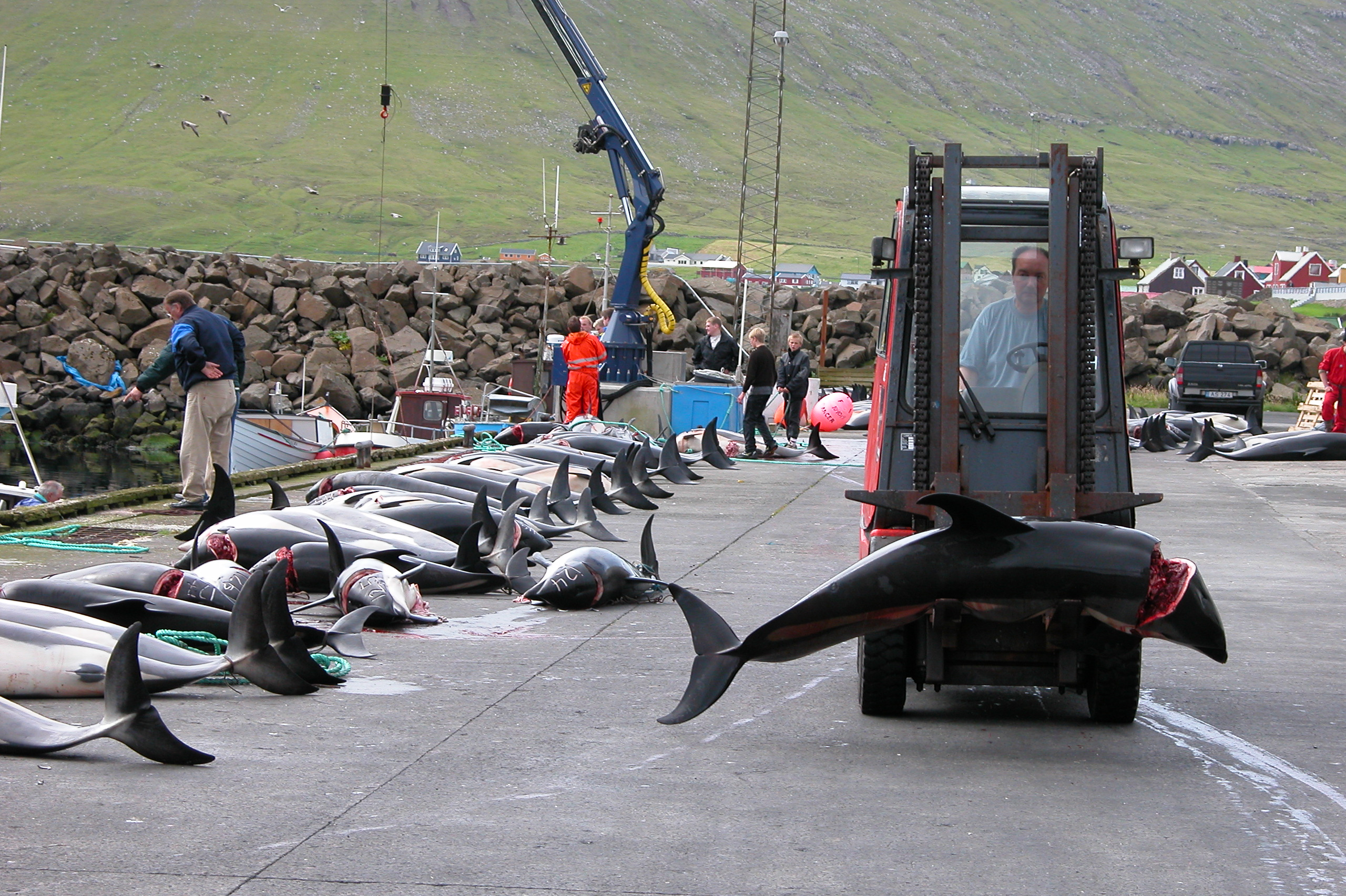
Atlantic white-sided dolphin caught in a drive hunt in Hvalba on the Faroe Islands being taken away with a forklift

Dolphin drive hunting, also called dolphin drive fishing, is a method of hunting dolphins – and occasionally other small cetaceans such as pilot whales – by herding them toward the shore with boats, typically into a bay or onto a beach. Their escape is prevented by closing off the route to the open sea or ocean with boats and nets. Dolphins are hunted this way in several places around the world including the Solomon Islands, the Faroe Islands, Peru, and Japan. The captured animals have been used for their meat; some animals end up in dolphinariums, while in Peru, many are used as shark bait.

Hunts have ended in countries including Iceland and the United States. The practice has attracted protests from animal rights groups in places including the Faroe Islands. There has been concern, too, about the possible health risk from eating meat containing PCB and DDT derivatives and mercury.

== By country ==
=== Faroe Islands ===
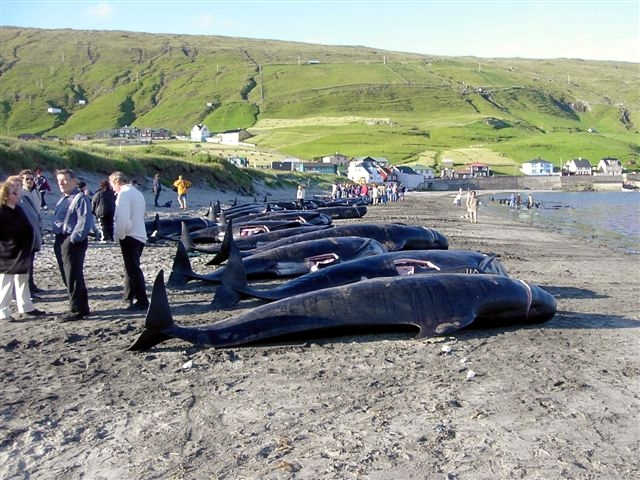
Killed pilot whales on the beach in the village Hvalba on the southernmost Faroese island Suðuroy, August 2002

Whaling in the Faroe Islands takes the form of beaching and slaughtering long-finned pilot whales. It has been practiced since about the time of the first Norse settlements on these North Atlantic islands, and thus can be considered aboriginal whaling. It is mentioned in the Sheep Letter, a Faroese law from 1298, a supplement to the Norwegian Gulating law.

It is closely regulated by the Faroese authorities, with around 800 long-finned pilot whales and some Atlantic white-sided dolphins slaughtered annually; mainly during the summer. The hunts, called grindadráp in Faroese, are non-commercial and are organized on a community level. Anyone who has a training certificate on slaughtering a pilot whale with the spinal-cord lance can participate. The police and Grindaformenn are allowed to remove people from the grind area.

Many Faroese consider the whale meat an important part of their food culture and history. Animal rights groups criticize the slaughter as being cruel and unnecessary. In November 2008, Høgni Debes Joensen, chief medical officer of the Faroe Islands and Pál Weihe, scientist, have recommended in a letter to the Faroese government that pilot whales should no longer be considered fit for human consumption because of the high level of mercury, PCB and DDT derivatives. However, the Faroese government did not forbid whaling. On 1 July 2011 the Faroese Food and Veterinary Authority announced their recommendation regarding the safety of eating meat and blubber from the pilot whale, which was not as strict as that of the chief medical officers. The new recommendation says only one dinner with whale meat and blubber per month, with a special recommendation for younger women, girls, pregnant women and breastfeeding women. From 2002 to 2009 the PCB concentration in whale meat has fallen by 75%, DDT values in the same time period have fallen by 70% and mercury levels have also fallen.

=== Iceland ===
In the mid-1950s, fishermen in Iceland requested assistance from the government to remove killer whales from Icelandic waters as they damaged fishing equipment. With fisheries accounting for 20% of Iceland's employment at the time, the perceived economic impact was significant. The Icelandic government asked the United States for assistance. As a NATO ally with an air base in Iceland, the US Navy deployed Patrol Squadrons VP-18 and VP-7 to achieve this task. According to the US Navy, hundreds of animals were killed with machineguns, rockets and depth charges.

In the late 1970s, after the Marine Mammal Protection Act of 1972, the hunting of killer whales in Iceland resumed, this time aiming to capture live animals for the entertainment industry. The first two killer whales captured went to Dolfinarium Harderwijk in the Netherlands. One of these animals was soon after transferred to SeaWorld. These captures continued until 1989 with the additional animals going to several aquariums.

=== Japan ===
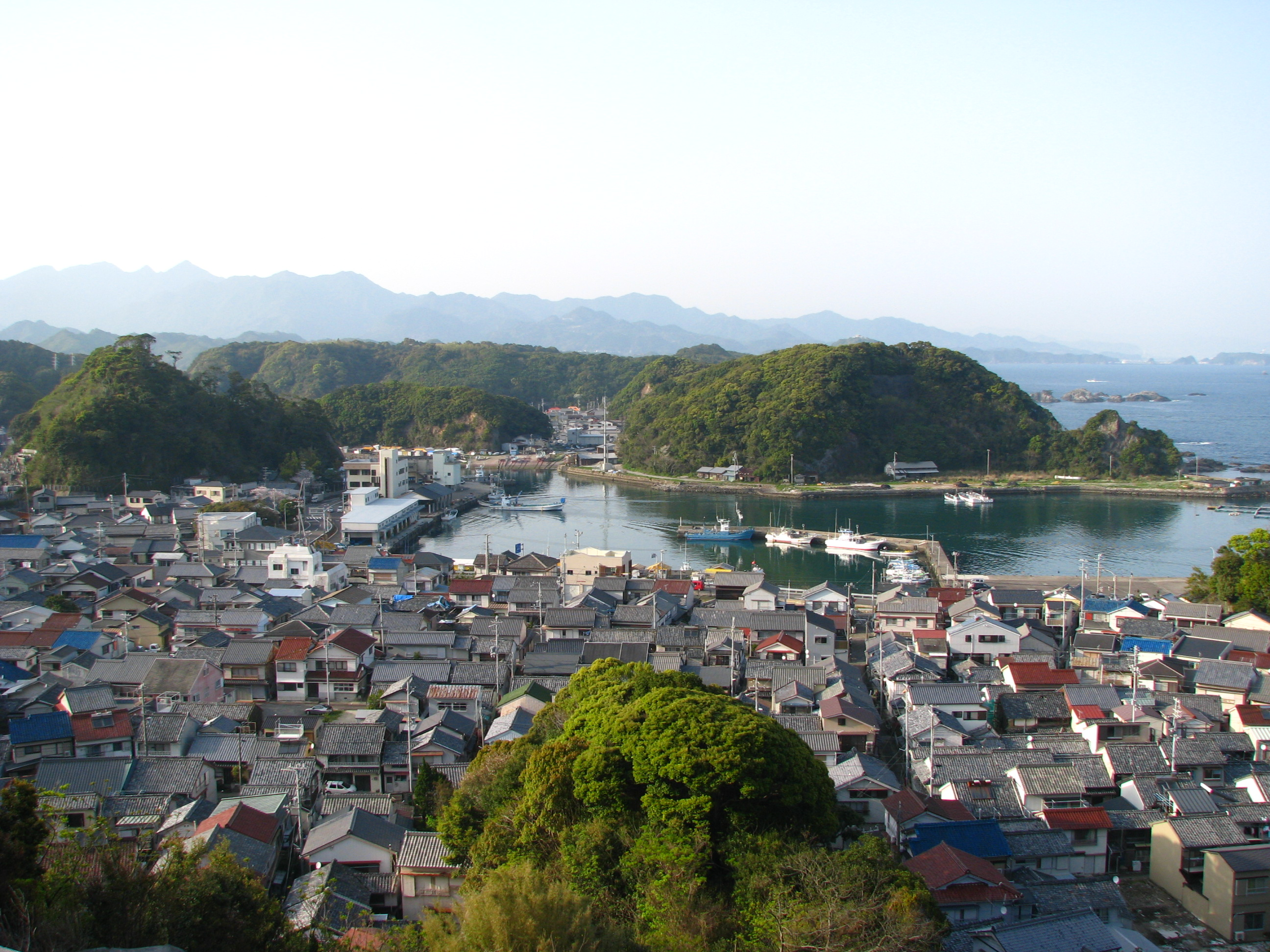
The fishing village of Taiji

The Taiji dolphin drive hunt captures small cetaceans for their meat and for sale to dolphinariums. Taiji has a long connection to Japanese whaling. The 2009 documentary film The Cove drew international attention to the hunt. In 2015, Japan's aquariums decided to stop purchasing dolphins from the hunt.

=== Peru ===
Dusky dolphin being skinned on a boat in Peru

Though it is forbidden under Peruvian law to hunt dolphins or eat their meat (sold as chancho marino, or sea pork in English), a large number of dolphins are still killed illegally by fishermen each year. To catch the dolphins, they are driven together with boats and encircled with nets, then harpooned, dragged on to the boat, and clubbed to death if still alive. Various species are hunted, such as the bottlenose and dusky dolphin.

According to estimates from local animal welfare organisation Mundo Azul released in October 2013, between 1,000 and 2,000 dolphins are killed annually for consumption, with a further 5,000 to 15,000 being killed for use as shark bait. Sharks are captured both for their meat and for use of their fins in shark fin soup.

=== Pacific Islands ===
Dolphins in a canoe after being killed by locals on the Solomon Islands

Drive hunting existed in Kiribati at least until the mid-20th century.

Dolphins are hunted in Malaita, in the Solomon Islands in the South Pacific, mainly for their meat and teeth, and also sometimes for live capture for dolphinariums. The hunt on South Malaita Island is smaller in scale than Tajai. After capture, the meat is shared equally between households. Dolphin teeth are also used in jewelry and as currency on the island.

=== Taiwan ===
On the Penghu Islands in Taiwan, drive fishing of bottlenose dolphins was practiced until 1990, when the practice was outlawed by the government. Mainly Indian Ocean bottlenose dolphins but also common bottlenose dolphins were captured in these hunts.

=== United States ===
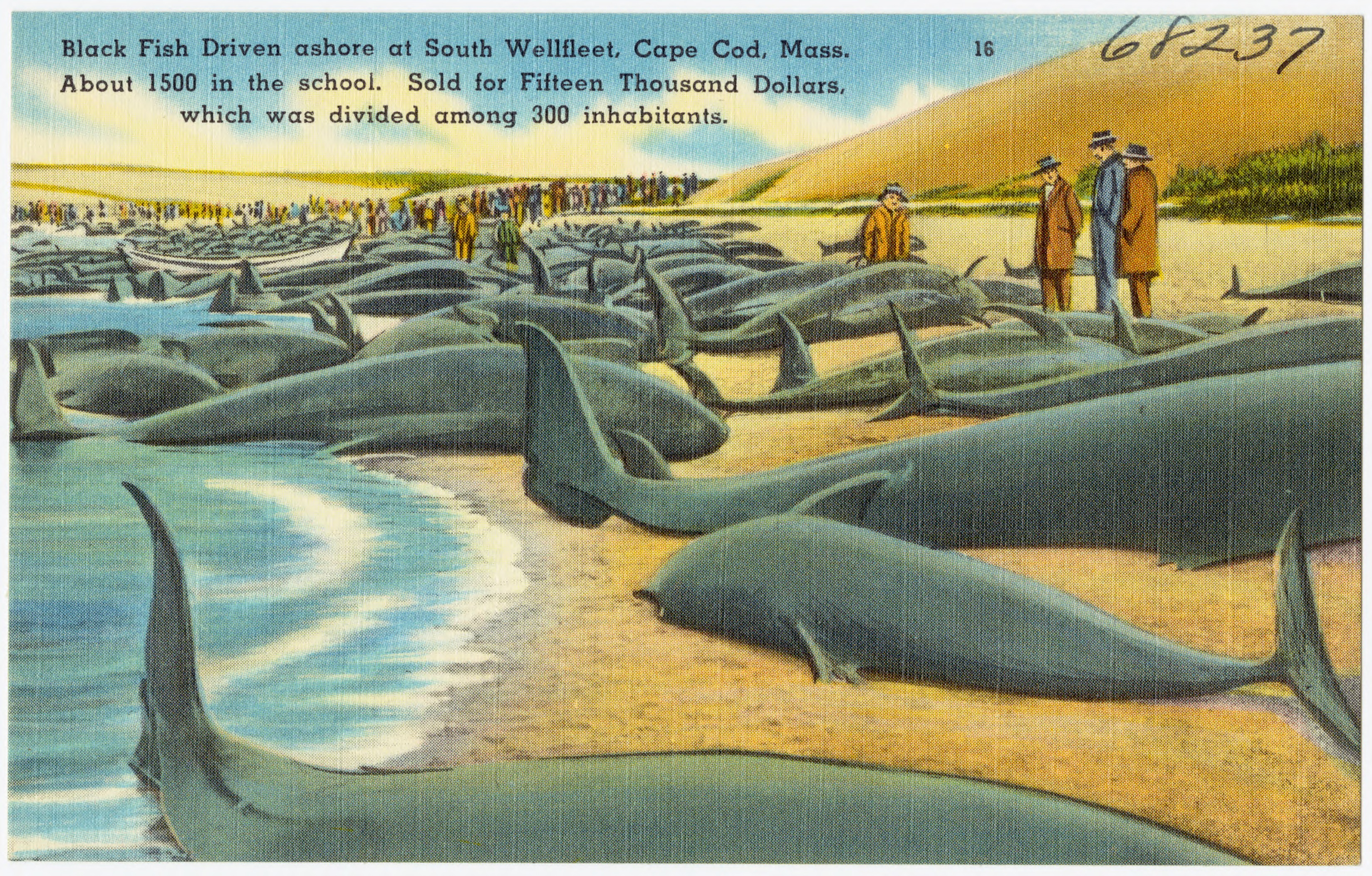
1500 pilot whales driven ashore at Cape Cod in 1885, and sold for a considerable sum for their oil

From 1644 at Southampton, New York, on Long Island, the colonists established an organised whale fishery, chasing pilot whales (then known as "blackfish") onto the shelving beaches for slaughter. They also processed drift whales they found on shore. They observed the Native Americans hunting techniques, improved on their weapons and boats, and then went out to ocean hunting. A significant number of commercial whalers on Long Island were members of the Shinnecock nation, who had experience in whale hunting on Long Island and frequently worked under contract for English settler captains. Special whaling privileges were granted to indigenous Long Islanders by colonial law, such as preserved rights to beached whales and legal protections for indentured native whalers.

In ancient Hawaii, fishermen occasionally hunted dolphins for their meat by driving them onto the beach and killing them. In their ancient legal system, dolphin meat was considered to be kapu (forbidden) for women together with several other kinds of food. As of 2008, dolphin drive hunting no longer takes place in Hawaii.

Hunting dolphins (at the time still often called fish or porpoises), primarily using harpoons and firearms, was a form of recreation along the shores of the Gulf of Mexico in Texas in the late 19th and early 20th century. Pleasure dolphin hunting cruises could be booked in Corpus Christi, Texas in the 1920s, with a promise to tourists that if no successful dolphin kill was made, the excursion would be free of charge. The practice aroused animal welfare concerns; there is no reference of the Texas hunt after the Second World War.

Drive hunting was used to capture orcas in Puget Sound, Washington State in the 1960s and 1970s for the entertainment industry. These hunts were led by aquarium owner and entrepreneur Edward "Ted" Griffin and his partner Don Goldsberry. Despite the Marine Mammal Protection Act of 1972, the practice continued until 1976 when the state of Washington ordered the release of some orcas that were being held in Budd Inlet; the state subsequently banned the practice.

== See also ==
- Animal welfare
- Whaling
