= Louie Psihoyos =

American photographer and film producer

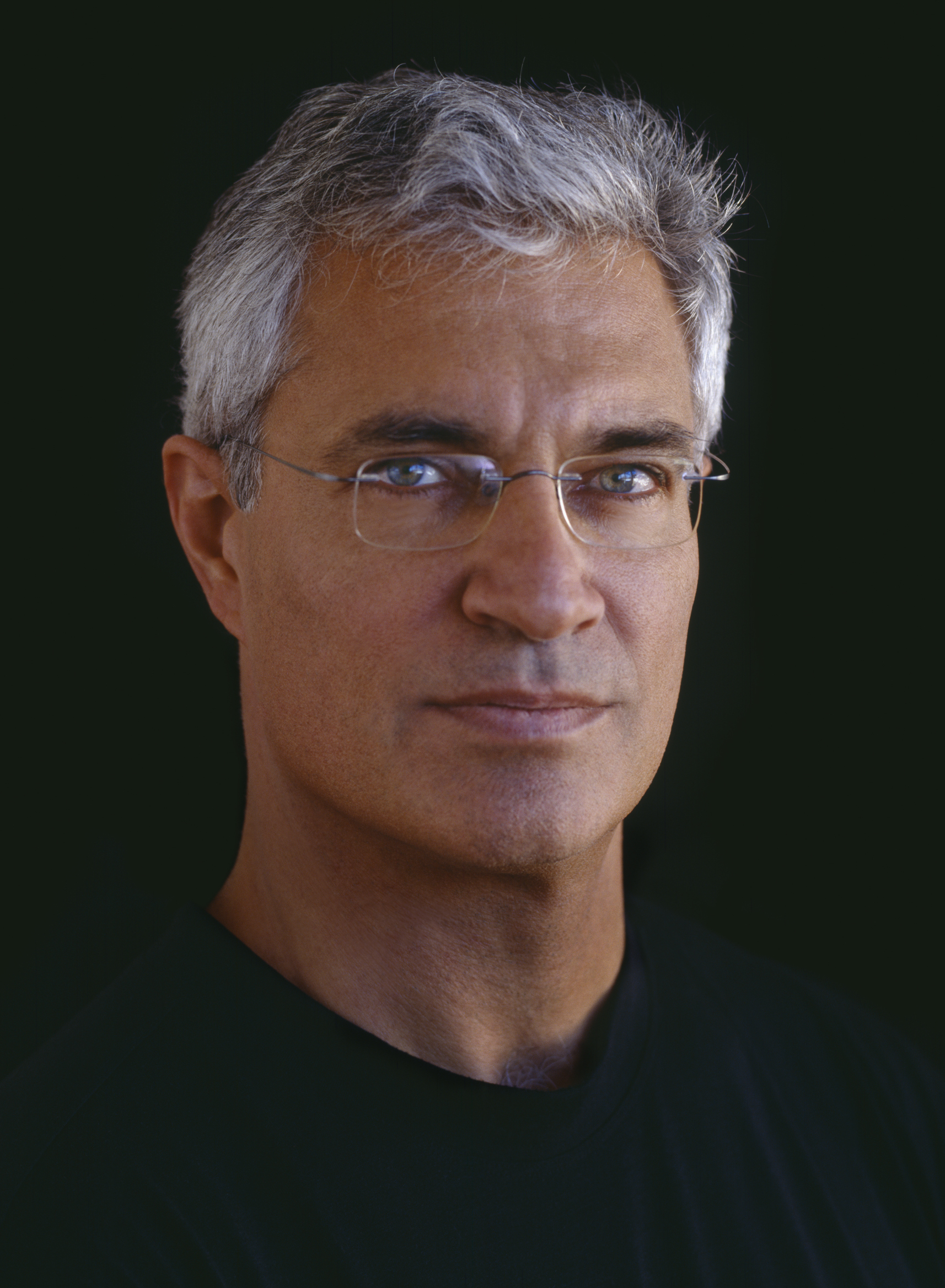
- Psihoyos in 2020
- Born: April 15, 1957 (age 69); Dubuque, Iowa, U.S.
- Occupations: Photographer, film director
- Website: www.psihoyos.com

Louis (Louie) Psihoyos (born April 15, 1957) is an American photographer and documentary film director known for his still photography and contributions to National Geographic. Psihoyos, a certified SCUBA diver, has become increasingly concerned with bringing awareness to underwater life. In 2009, he directed and appeared in the feature-length documentary The Cove, which won an Oscar for Best Documentary Feature.

== Early life and career ==
Psihoyos was born in Dubuque, Iowa in 1957, the son of a Greek immigrant who left the Peloponnesos region after World War II. Psihoyos took an interest in photography at the age of fourteen. As a teenager, he worked as a photo intern with the Telegraph Herald newspaper. During that time he also worked as an extra on the set of the 1978 film F.I.S.T.

Psihoyos attended the University of Missouri, majoring in photojournalism. In 1980, at the age of 23, he was hired by National Geographic and remained with the magazine for seventeen years. During this time he married and had two children. He received multiple awards for his photography, including first place in the World Press Contest and the Hearst Award. He has worked with magazines such as Smithsonian, Discover, GEO, Time, Newsweek, The New York Times Magazine, New York, Sports Illustrated, and Rock & Ice.

Psihoyos wrote and photographed the book Hunting Dinosaurs with friend and collaborator John Knoebber. It was published in 1994.

== Later work and films ==
Psihoyos co-founded the non-profit organization Oceanic Preservation Society in 2005. The objective of the organization is to educate the public on what is happening to the Earth's oceans and to encourage individuals to make a difference so that future generations will have an enriched environment instead of a diminishing one.

=== The Cove ===
Together with Ric O'Barry, Jim Clark, and a crew, Psihoyos filmed the feature-length documentary The Cove. Released in 2009, the film examines the yearly killing of dolphins in Taiji, Wakayama, Japan. Unable to acquire permission from the Japanese government, the filmmakers were required to go to extreme lengths in order to obtain their footage, utilizing equipment and tactics never previously used in a documentary film. The film also features the International Whaling Commission (IWC) and IWC's refusal to protect small cetaceans, such as dolphins, primarily due to Japan's influence on the commission. Furthermore, The Cove highlights the risk of mercury poisoning to humans who consume dolphin meat while documenting a Japanese government program to distribute dolphin meat to Japanese school children. The meat that is not distributed is sold and listed as whale meat. On March 7, 2010, The Cove won the Academy Award for Best Documentary Feature at the 82nd Academy Awards..." As well as its Oscar win, The Cove was nominated for awards at multiple festivals including Hot Docs, Sundance Film Festival, Toronto Film Festival, Sheffield Doc/Fest. and Crested Butte Film Festival.

=== Racing Extinction ===
Racing Extinction is a 2015 film by Psihoyos about the ongoing Anthropogenic mass extinction of species and the efforts by scientists, activists and journalists to document it. In the documentary the slaughter of sea life around the world is brought to the viewer's attention. Racing Extinction addresses two major causes of species extinction: climate change and the wildlife trade. Marine species are featured prominently for both, from tiny organisms whose shells are dissolving as a result of acidifying ocean water, to large whale sharks caught for their fins, meat and oil. Psihoyos, along with the help from activists, Tesla Motors, and Travis Threlkel, projected images depicting the endangerment of the planet onto buildings in New York City. The film was the winner of the 2016 Cinema for Peace International Green Film Award.

=== The Game Changers ===
The Game Changers is a 2018 documentary film about the benefits of plant-based diets for athletes.

=== Mission: Joy ===
Mission: Joy is a 2021 documentary that explores the special friendship between Archbishop Desmond Tutu and the Dalai Lama. Although they are opposites in many ways, their playful friendship shows us that our shared humanity is bigger than our differences. Their life stories remind us that joy is an inside job, that joy and pain are inseparable, and that deep connection is one of the secrets to joy.

=== Joe Rogan ===
Psihoyos appeared on the Powerful JRE podcast on November 18, 2019.

=== You Are What You Eat: A Twin Experiment ===
You Are What You Eat: A Twin Experiment is a 2024 American Vegan documentary series set for streaming on Netflix. It is based on an 8-week study conducted by Stanford University that put 22 sets of genetically identical twins

=== The Plastic Detox ===
The Plastic Detox is a 2026 documentary film co-directed by Psihoyos and Josh Murphy. Released on Netflix on March 16, 2026.
