= Ric O'Barry =

American animal rights activist

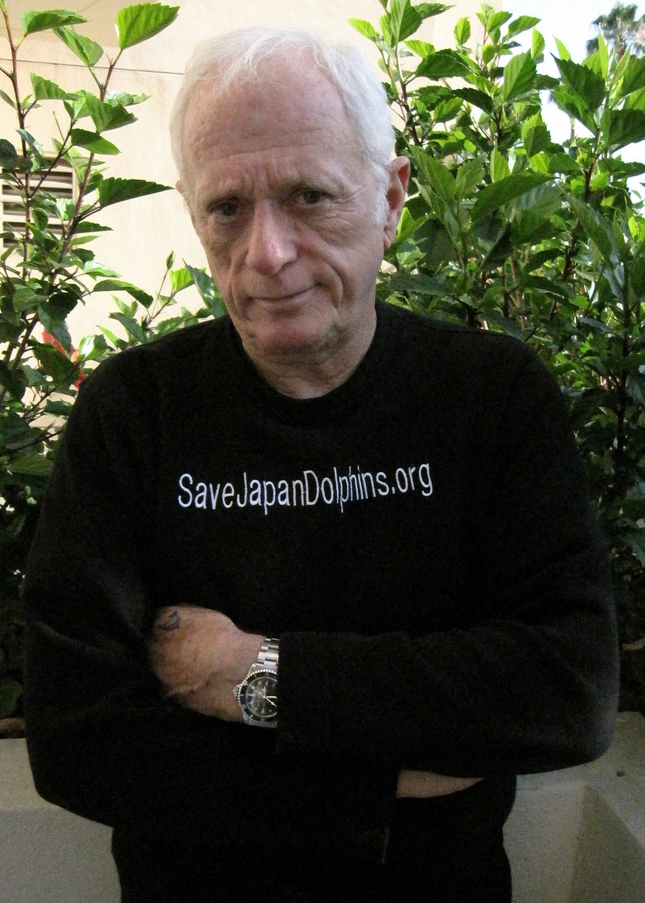
- Ric O'Barry, 2009
- Born: Richard Barry O'Feldman; October 14, 1939 (age 86)
- Occupations: Founder and director of Ric O'Barry's Dolphin Project
- Known for: Animal rights activist and former animal trainer
- Website: www.dolphinproject.com

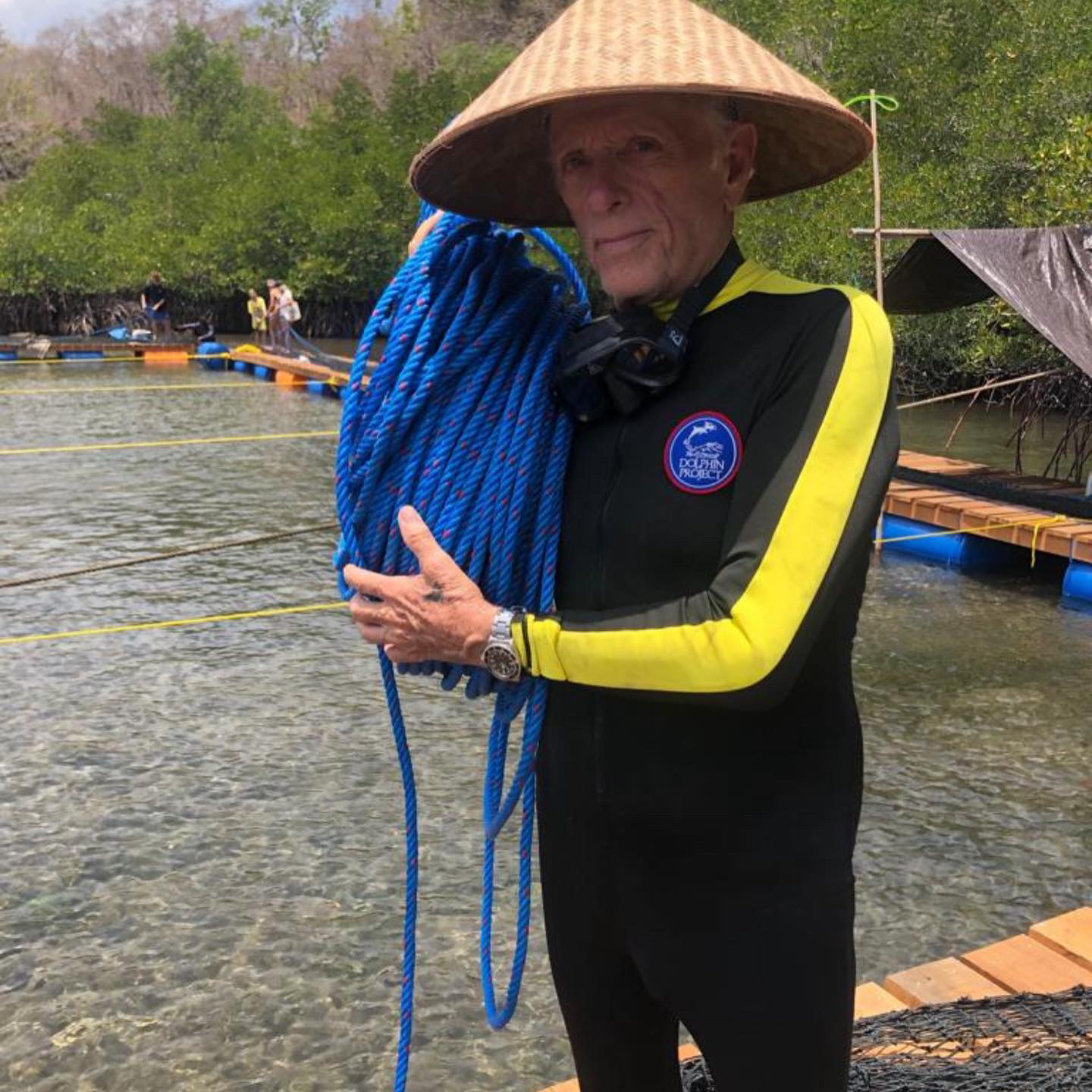
Ric O'Barry in West Bali assisting with the construction of a seapen for ex performing dolphins

Richard O'Barry (born Richard Barry O'Feldman; October 14, 1939) is an American animal rights activist and former animal trainer who was first recognized in the 1960s for capturing and training the five dolphins that were used in the TV series Flipper. O'Barry transitioned from training dolphins to instead advocating against industries that keep dolphins in captivity, after one of the Flipper dolphins died. In 1970, O'Barry founded the Dolphin Project, a group that aims to educate the public about captivity and, where feasible, free captive dolphins. He was featured in the Academy Award–winning film The Cove (2009), which used covert techniques to expose the yearly dolphin drive hunting that goes on in Taiji, Japan.

== Flipper ==
O'Barry started out capturing and training dolphins for the Miami Seaquarium and through the 1960s became the head trainer for the five dolphins who collectively played Flipper on the popular American TV show, while also serving as stunt double for show cast member Luke Halpin. O'Barry also trained and performed with the orca Hugo at the Miami Seaquarium. When, in early 1970, a few years after production of Flipper had ended, Kathy, the dolphin who most often played Flipper, did not resurface for air, O'Barry considered the possibility that she had committed suicide. He later concluded that capturing, displaying, and training dolphins to perform tricks is wrong.

== Activism ==
On Earth Day in 1970, O'Barry founded Dolphin Project, an organization dedicated to educating the public about the plight of dolphins in captivity. He also pioneered work to demonstrate rehabilitation and release as a viable alternative for captive dolphins. O'Barry has since released over twenty-five captive dolphins in Haiti, Colombia, Guatemala, Nicaragua, Brazil, The Bahamas and the United States.

For more than 40 years, he has spoken about the harmful effects of captivity on dolphins at lectures and conferences around the world. In 1991 in recognition of his contribution to the protection of dolphins, O'Barry received an Environmental Achievement Award, presented by the US Committee for the United Nations Environmental Program. In 2007, Ric and Helene O'Barry became consultants for the Earth Island Institute's International Marine Mammal Project.

O'Barry resigned from his position at the Earth Island Institute in September 2014, due to disagreements with its management regarding the acceptance of funds from the tuna industry, and its use of Fish Aggregation Devices.

O’Barry is co-author of three books, Behind the Dolphin Smile, To Free a Dolphin (both with Keith Colbourne) and most recently Die Bucht about dolphins and the making of The Cove (published in Germany with Hans Peter Roth). O'Barry is a Fellow National in the Explorers Club. Living in Coconut Grove, Florida, He is Founder/Director of the non-profit organization, Ric O'Barry's Dolphin Project Inc. His Dolphin Project leads an international effort to stop the killing of dolphins, end the trafficking in live dolphins to theme parks and captive swim-with-the-dolphins attractions and continues to lecture and speak out against the captivity industry.

In 2018, O'Barry was noted in the book, Rescuing Ladybugs by author and animal advocate Jennifer Skiff as “the man leading the global fight to protect dolphins” after being moved to action after witnessing the death of a dolphin named Kathy who he had trained while employed by the Miami Seaquarium.

== Sugarloaf ==
In 1996, O'Barry and Lloyd A. Good III, working on behalf of Sugarloaf Dolphin Sanctuary and The Dolphin Project, transported 2 dolphins, "Luther" and "Buck", from the U.S. Navy facility in San Diego, California to Key West, Florida.

== Dolphin sanctuary and rehabilitation ==
Ric O'Barry co-founded the worlds' first dolphin rehabilitation center and sanctuary in West Bali in 2019. The center was founded in collaboration with the Ministry of Environment and Forestry and the Jakarta Animal Aid Network. Here, ex performing dolphins underwent a rehabilitation program and were eventually released to open sea with GPS transmitters allowing post release monitoring.

== The Cove ==
O'Barry was featured in the Academy Award–winning feature-length documentary The Cove, directed by Louie Psihoyos which investigates links between the killing, capture, trade and display of dolphins all over the world. The 2009 film centers on Taiji, Wakayama, Japan, drawing attention to the hunt of about 2,000 dolphins taking place there every year.

O’Barry and his son, Lincoln, created the television series Blood Dolphin$ for Discovery Channel's Animal Planet, which continues on where The Cove left off.
