= The Cove (film) =

2009 documentary film by Louie Psihoyos

Coordinates: 33°35′55.92″N 135°56′46.86″E

- Film poster featuring a photograph of Canadian freediving world champion Mandy-Rae Cruickshank swimming with dolphins
- Directed by: Louie Psihoyos
- Written by: Mark Monroe
- Produced by: Paula DuPré Pesmen; Fisher Stevens
- Starring: Ric O'Barry; Louie Psihoyos
- Cinematography: Brook Aitken
- Edited by: Geoffrey Richman
- Music by: J. Ralph
- Production companies: Participant Media; Oceanic Preservation Society; Diamond Docs; Skyfish Films
- Distributed by: Lionsgate; Roadside Attractions
- Release dates: January 2009 (Sundance); July 31, 2009 (United States)
- Running time: 87 minutes
- Country: United States
- Languages: English; Japanese
- Box office: $1.1 million

The Cove is a 2009 American documentary film directed by Louie Psihoyos that analyzes and questions dolphin hunting practices in Japan. The film is a call to action to halt mass dolphin kills and captures and change Japanese fishing practices. It also seeks to inform and educate the public about the dangers of keeping cetaceans in captivity and the increasing hazard of mercury poisoning from consuming dolphin meat.

Psihoyos is a former-National Geographic photographer and a co-founder of the Oceanic Preservation Society, and the film is presented from an ocean conservationist's point of view. Portions were filmed secretly in 2007 using underwater microphones and high-definition cameras disguised as rocks. The film highlights the fact that the number of dolphins killed in the Taiji dolphin drive hunt is several times greater than the number of whales killed in the Antarctic, and asserts that 23,000 dolphins and porpoises are killed in Japan every year by the country's whaling industry. The migrating dolphins are herded into a cove where they are netted off. The young and pretty are sold to oceanariums and dolphinariums around the world, and the rest are brutally slaughtered. The film argues that dolphin hunting as practiced in Japan is unnecessary and cruel.

Although The Cove has drawn some controversy over its supposed lack of neutrality, it has received overwhelmingly positive reviews from critics. Most notably, it won the Academy Award for Best Documentary Feature Film at the 82nd Academy Awards in 2010. It also won the U.S. Audience Award at the 25th annual Sundance Film Festival in January 2009, selected out of 879 submissions in the category.

== Synopsis ==
The film follows former-dolphin-trainer-turned-activist Ric O'Barry's quest to document the dolphin hunting operations in Taiji, Wakayama, Japan. In the 1960s, O'Barry helped capture and train the five wild dolphins who shared the role of "Flipper" in the hit television series of the same name. The show fueled widespread public adoration of dolphins and influenced the development of marine parks that included dolphins among their attractions.

According to O'Barry, one of the dolphins committed a form of suicide in his arms by closing her blowhole voluntarily in order to suffocate, after which he came to see the dolphin capture industry as cruel and inhumane. One day later, he was arrested off the island of Bimini for attempting to set free a captured dolphin. Since then, O'Barry has dedicated himself full-time as an advocate on behalf of dolphins around the world.

After meeting with O'Barry, Psihoyos and his crew travel to Taiji, Japan, a town that appears to be devoted to dolphins and whales. A group of local fishermen engage in dolphin drive hunting and generate tremendous revenues for the town by selling trapped dolphins to aquariums and marine parks around the world, with a premium paid for female bottlenose dolphins.

In an isolated cove surrounded by wire fences and "Keep Out" signs, an activity takes place that the townspeople attempt to hide from the public. The dolphins that are not sold are driven into the cove and killed, with only modest income derived from the sale of the meat to supermarkets throughout Japan.

All activists who attempt to view or film the dolphin killing in the cove are physically prevented from doing so by the fishermen, with the support of the local police and government, and the filmmakers are questioned by the authorities. Faced with this, Psihoyos, O'Barry, decide to covertly film what is taking place in the cove.

Inspired by a Japanese rock temple, the crew works with Industrial Light & Magic artists in order to create disguised rocks which can hide high-definition video cameras and military-grade thermal cameras. Under the cover of night, the film crew installs the cameras and audio-recording equipment throughout the cove. They also build a blimp drone with a gyroscoped camera that is used to take aerial footage of the cove after the massacre.

The local government officials are involved in helping to hide the slaughter, and the Japanese public is largely unaware of the hunt and the marketing of dolphin meat, which contains dangerously high levels of mercury. Two Taiji city councilors are interviewed who have advocated for the removal of dolphin meat from local school lunches due concerns about mercury.

The film shows several minutes of unedited footage of local fishermen trapping herds of dolphins and stabbing them one by one, causing all of the dolphins to die of blood loss. The entire cove turns deep red.

Near the end, Psihoyos shows some of the grisly footage he was able to film during a dolphin slaughter to a Japanese official, who had repeatedly tried to minimize the incident during his interview. The official's friendly demeanor hardens, and he asks Psihoyos when and where the footage was filmed.

The film also reports on Japan's alleged "buying" of the votes of poor nations in the International Whaling Commission, stating that Japan has rewarded nations with infrastructure projects in exchange for supporting it.

After Psihoyos shows the footage to the Japanese official, the film cuts to O'Barry interrupting the annual meeting of the IWC. As the Japanese delegate is saying how Japanese fishermen have made their whaling tactics more humane, O'Barry enters the crowded meeting room with a TV playing the footage from the cove strapped to his chest and walks around until he is escorted from the building. He then stands with the TV in a crowded intersection in Japan, where passersby stop to watch.

In a post-credits scene, the film crew is shown gifting the drone blimp to the local authorities.

== Cast ==
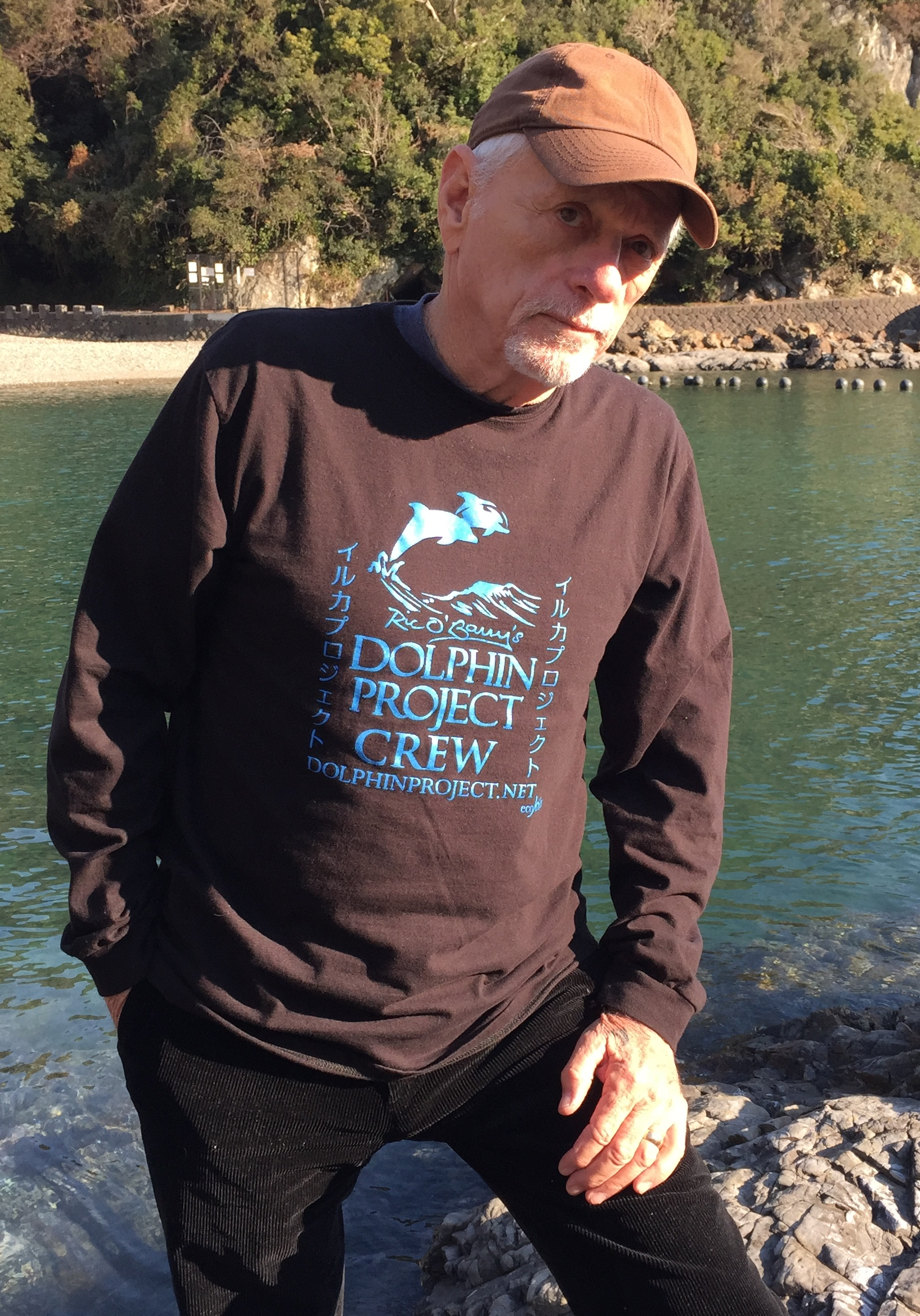
Ric O'Barry at the Cove in Taiji, Japan, in 2014

Today they would kill me, if they could. And I'm not exaggerating. If these fisherman could catch me and kill me, they would.

— Ric O'Barry, In the first five minutes of the film.
- Ric O'Barry – Co-Founder, Oceanic Preservation Society
- Louie Psihoyos – Earth Island Institute
- Hardy Jones – Founder, BlueVoice.org
- Michael Illiff – Institute of Antarctic and Southern Ocean Studies, University of Tasmania
- Joji Morishita – IWC Delegate for Japan (archival footage)
- Ian Campbell – Former Australian Cabinet Minister
- Captain Paul Watson – President, Sea Shepherd Conservation Society; Co-Founder, Greenpeace
- Doug DeMaster, Ph.D. – U.S. Deputy Commissioner for the IWC
- Frederic Briand, Ph.D. - IWC Commissioner for Monaco
- Dave Rastovich – Co-Founder, Surfers for Cetaceans
- Hayden Panettiere – Whaleman Foundation/Save the Whales Again! (archival footage)
- Isabel Lucas – Whaleman Foundation/Save the Whales Again! (archival footage)
- Hannah Fraser (archival footage)
- Charles Hambleton – a member of Louie's "secret OPS" team ("a guy that has a heart of gold and nerves of steel")
- Simon Hutchins – a member of Louie's "secret OPS" team ("the only guy that had military experience")
- Joe Chisholm – a member of Louie's "secret OPS" team ("organized rock concerts")
- Mandy-Rae Cruickshank – a member of Louie's "secret OPS" team (a freediver)
- Kirk Krack – a member of Louie's "secret OPS" team (a freediver)
- Roger Payne, Ph.D. – Ocean Alliance
- Hideki Moronuki – Deputy Director, Fisheries Agency of Japan; Manager of Cetacean Quotas
- Dan Goodman – Legal Advisor to Japan's IWC Delegation
- Tetsuya Endo, Ph.D. – Health Sciences University of Hokkaido
- C. Scott Baker, Ph.D. – Specialist in DNA Species Identification; Oregon State University
- Brook Aitken – OPS Cameraman
- Dr. John Potter – Underwater Acoustics Cousultant
- John Fuller – Former IWC Delegate for Antigua and Barbuda
- Atherton Martin – Former IWC Representative for Dominica

== Production ==
To film in the cove, the filmmakers used specialized high-definition cameras that were camouflaged to look like rocks. These cameras were so well hidden that, according to director Louie Psihoyos, the crew had a hard time finding them again. A high-grade military thermal camera and different night vision cameras were also used in the production of the film.

== Reception ==
=== Film critics ===
On review aggregator website Rotten Tomatoes, it has 95% approval rating based on reviews from 133 critics, with an average rating of 8.00/10; the site's "critics consensus" reads: "Though decidedly one-sided, The Cove is an impeccably crafted, suspenseful exposé of the covert slaughter of dolphins in Japan." On Metacritic, which assigns a normalized rating out of 100 to reviews from mainstream critics, the film has an average score of 84 based on 26 reviews, indicating "universal acclaim".

Roger Ebert gave the film four stars (out of four), calling it "a certain Oscar nominee". Jeannette Catsoulis of The New York Times called the film "an exceptionally well-made documentary that unfolds like a spy thriller", going on to describe it as "one of the most audacious and perilous operations in the history of the conservation movement". Other reviewers also played up the espionage angle of the film, including Time magazine's Mary Pols, who said The Cove "puts Hollywood capers like Mission Impossible to shame", and Peter Rainer of The Christian Science Monitor, who called it "a rousing piece of real-world thriller filmmaking".

Some reviews recognized the film's entertainment value, but did not view it as an "objective documentary". Wall Street Journal critic Joe Morgenstern labeled the film a "quasidocumentary framed as a high-tech thriller" with an "agitprop style" that has "an excess of artifice and a dearth of facts". David Cox of The Guardian Film Blog called it a "piece of evangelism", and mused rhetorically: "Westerners ... kill and eat cows. Easterners eat dolphins. What's the difference?". Michelle Orange of Movieline ended her review: "How much of this should we believe? As a piece of propaganda, The Cove is brilliant; as a story of ingenuity and triumph over what seems like senseless brutality, it is exceptionally well-told; but as a conscientious overview of a complex and deeply fraught, layered issue, it invokes the same phrase as even the most well-intentioned, impassioned activist docs: Buyer beware."

=== Reactions in Taiji, Japan ===
The whale and dolphin hunting season in Japan usually begins on September 1 each year, but in 2009 it began on September 9. Although activists tended to believe this was because of the publicity generated by the film, it was reported that the delay was due to the weather and rough seas. According to campaigners, out of the 100 dolphins captured on September 9, some were taken to be sold to marine museums and the rest were released, while 50 pilot whales were killed and sold for meat on the same day. Some campaigners began to claim it had become apparent that The Cove was having an impact on the way in which Japanese fisherman normally conducted the dolphin hunt, though on March 23, 2010, the Japanese government stated: "The dolphin hunting is a part of traditional fishery of this country and it has been lawfully carried out."

After the film won the Oscar for Best Documentary, the mayor of Taiji and the chief of the Taiji Fishery Union released a statement that said: "The hunt is performed legally and properly with the permission of Wakayama Prefecture [in which Taiji resides]." Taiji assemblyman Hisato Ryono, one of the two local legislators who broke ranks and publicly called for removal of dolphin meat from school lunches, said he was lied to by the producers of the film about what the film would contain. (Note: Professor Endo is also named (in the Jay Alabaster article) as an individual who complained that the film's makers approached him under false pretenses. But he teaches at a university in Hokkaido, not Taiji.)

Since the release of the film, a much larger number of activists, mainly non-Japanese, began to visit Taiji to protest or film the dolphin hunts. The Taiji fishermen responded by constructing an elaborate structure of tarps to better conceal the drive-hunting activities in and around the cove. Filmmaker Megumi Sasaki has argued that the film and subsequent activism and campaigning by foreigners and the Sea Shepherd Conservation Society have been poorly received by the population of Taiji, and that backlash has resulted in the practice continuing.

=== Reaction from Seaworld ===
SeaWorld spokesperson Fred Jacobs responded to the film by saying, "We think we're being unfairly criticized for something we're opposed to," and that "SeaWorld opposes the dolphin hunts documented in The Cove. We do not purchase any animals from these hunts. More than 80 percent of the marine mammals in our care were born in our parks. We haven't collected a dolphin from the wild in decades", though he did not condemn those who purchase from the Taiji dolphin hunt. In light of this, some criticized O'Barry for emphasizing that dolphinariums are a large contributing factor to the economic success of the dolphin hunt in Taiji and for encouraging boycotts of dolphin shows to protest the slaughter.

In the United States, it is currently illegal to import dolphins obtained from a drive, including the drive hunt at Taiji, as it is considered an inhumane method by which to capture the animals, and, since 1993, there have been no permits issued to facilities in the United States to import dolphins acquired through drive hunts. Marilee Menard, the executive director of the Alliance of Marine Mammal Parks and Aquariums, has also stated that she believes the filmmakers are "misrepresenting that the majority of zoos and aquariums with dolphins around the world are taking these animals."

=== Reaction in Western Australia ===
In August 2009, after the screening of the film in Sydney, Melbourne, and Brisbane film festivals, the councillors of the Shire of Broome, Western Australia, voted unanimously to suspend its sister city relationship with the Japanese whaling port town of Taiji, as long as the latter continues its dolphin slaughter. This decision was reversed that October, less than two months later.

== Release in Japan ==
The film was initially screened only at two small venues in Japan: at the Foreign Correspondents' Club in Tokyo in September 2009, and at the Tokyo International Film Festival in October 2009, where it received mixed reviews. A Japanese film distributor, Medallion Media/Unplugged, subsequently acquired the rights to screen the film in Japan and hoped to release it in Japanese cinemas in June 2010. The company prepared the film for presentation in Japan by pixelating the faces of Taiji residents and fishermen depicted in the film. Nationalist protesters vowed to block the release of the film in Japan, and dozens equipped with loudspeakers demonstrated outside the distributor's office in central Tokyo.

In April 2010, Colonel Frank Eppich, the United States Air Force commander of Yokota Air Base, located near Tokyo, banned screenings of the film at the base theater. A base spokesman said that The Cove was banned because using a base venue to display the film could be seen as an endorsement of the film, saying: "We have a lot of issues with Japan ... and anything done on an American base would be seen as an approval of that event." In response, Louie Psihoyos said he would give 100 DVD copies of the film to Yokota base personnel.

Until June 2010, the controversy over the film and the film's subject received little press attention in Japanese-language media in Japan. Boyd Harnell of the Japan Times stated on May 23, 2010, that Japanese news editors had told him the topic was "too sensitive" for them to cover.

A screening scheduled for June 26, 2010, at Theater N in Shibuya was canceled after staff were harassed by protesters. Unplugged stated that it was in negotiations with other theaters to screen the film. Another theater in Tokyo and one in Osaka subsequently declined to screen the film. In response, a group of 61 media figures, including journalist Akihiro Ōtani and filmmaker Yoichi Sai, released a statement expressing concern over the threat to freedom of speech by the intimidation by right-wing groups. The Directors Guild of Japan also asked theaters not to refuse to show the film, arguing that "such moves would limit opportunities to express thoughts and beliefs, which are the core of democracy."

On June 9, 2010, Tsukuru Publishing Co. sponsored a screening of the film and panel discussion at Nakano Zero theater in Nakano, Tokyo. The panelists included five who had signed the statement mentioned above. Afterwards, panel member Kunio Suzuki, former head of Issuikai, an Uyoku dantai (rightist) group, condemned the right-winger's threats against theaters and urged that the film be shown, saying that "Not letting people watch the movie is anti-Japanese".

In response to the cancellation of screenings of the film in Japan, Japanese video sharing site Nico Nico Douga screened the film free on June 18, 2010. The same week, Ric O'Barry was invited to speak at several universities in Japan about the film. O'Barry stated that he was planning on bringing several Hollywood stars to Taiji in September 2010 in an attempt to halt that year's hunt.

On July 3, 2010, six theaters in Sendai, Tokyo, Yokohama, Kyoto, Osaka, and Hachinohe began screening the film. Right-wing nationalists protested outside four of the theaters (the theaters in Tokyo and Yokohama had obtained court injunctions prohibiting protests outside their venues), but close police supervision prevented any disruption to the viewing schedules and ensured free access for viewers to the theaters.

A local Taiji activist group called People Concerned for the Ocean announced that, on March 5 and 6, 2011, they would distribute DVDs of the film, dubbed in Japanese, to all 3,500 residents of Taiji.

== Controversy ==
=== Portrayal of Japanese people ===
There has been some controversy over the depiction of some of the Japanese people in the film. Hirotaka Akamatsu, Japanese Minister of Agriculture and Fisheries, said: "it is regrettable that this movie is made as a message that brutal Japanese are killing cute dolphins". However, director Louie Psihoyos spoke of his sympathy for the Japanese people, many of whom are unaware of the situation at the cove, saying: "To me, it's a love letter. I'm giving you the information your government won't give you."

=== Issues with filming techniques ===
Close-up Gendai, an investigative journalism program on NHK, ran a segment that raised questions about the objectivity of the film. One scene in the film was presented as having been manufactured for the camera, and the segment then entered into a discussion with a commentator on whether the film should properly be called a documentary. Louie Psihoyos was interviewed by Close-up Gendai, but no response was broadcast regarding the allegedly scripted and acted scene. Elsewhere, he stated categorically that none of the scenes in the film were staged.

Fishermen in Taiji complained that the film one-sidedly depicted their angry reactions at being chased by cameras, and did not adequately explain the backdrop—that they had been harassed by activists from organizations such as the Sea Shepherd Conservation Society and individuals attracted by the bounty offered by that organization for capturing damaging footage. The NHK (not on Close-up Gendai) concluded that the activists did so in order to capture the local fishermen making angry and wild expressions on film and in photos. (Note: A different program broadcast a year after the Close-up Gendai segment featured footage of the activists irritating local people by saying nasty words in both Japanese and English and shoving cameras in their faces.)

=== Inaccuracies ===
Tetsuya Endō, an associate professor at the Health Sciences University of Hokkaido who is interviewed in the film, complained that the filmmakers approached him under false pretenses. He also said the sample of meat in the film that contained an anomalously high level of mercury (2000 ppm) was dolphin liver, (Note: The subtitle in the film read: "This is dolphin meat. This is containing 2000ppm".) (Note: Endo's findings on the 2000 ppm liver can be confirmed in a report for fiscal purpose, which also cites publication in a peer-reviewed journal.) which Taiji's fishermen's union banned from being sold in 2003 at his prompting. Endo sought to have his scenes removed from the film and, when they were not, sued the Japanese rights-holder, Medallion Media, and the distributor, Unplugged, for ¥11 million for damages to his reputation. The litigation opened in Tokyo District Court on December 1, 2010.

At the end of the film, the assistant chief of the whaling division at Japan's Fisheries Agency, Hideki Moronuki, is erroneously said to have been "fired" in 2008. The error was reported by the investigative news program Close-up Gendai, and Psihoyos, when confronted, conceded he might have misunderstood. (Note: Psihoyos, in a video-conference interview with Close-up Gendai, attributed the information to Akira Nakamae, the Deputy Minister of Fisheries, whom he met on an airplane bound for Santiago, where the 2008 IWC meeting was being held. Psihoyos conceded he may have misunderstood, and what was actually said might have been that he was "moved" (at around 20:00 minutes into the program). Nakamae, when contacted by NHK, stated he "never gave the reply that [Moronuki] was fired" (at around 22:00 minutes).)

=== Response documentaries ===
In 2015, filmmaker Keiko Yagi released a documentary titled Behind The Cove, which presented the side of the Taiji fishermen. The film was screened at the Montreal World Film Festival.

In 2018, filmmaker Megumi Sasaki released a follow-up film examining the legacy of The Cove, titled A Whale of a Tale. The film examines the cultural divide between Western activists, who have continued to travel to Japan to protest the Taiji dolphin drive hunt for many years after the film's release, and the local population. It argues that dolphin meat consumption in Japan was already in decline, and The Cove and subsequent Western activism has been poorly received by the local population and used by Japanese nationalists to garner support to continue the practice.

== Awards and nominations ==
The Cove won over 25 film awards. Some notable awards include Best Documentary from the Environmental Media Awards, three awards from the Cinema Eye Honors, and the Academy Award for Best Documentary Feature at the 82nd Academy Awards.

A list of nominations and awards received by the film is as follows:

- 82nd Academy Awards (2010) – Best Documentary Feature (won) During the presentation ceremony, on March 7, 2010, ABC cameras abruptly cut away to the crowd when O'Barry raised a banner urging the audience to "Text DOLPHIN to 44144". TV Guide labeled the moment as "Fastest Cutaway", and film critic Sean Means wrote it showed that the Oscar ceremony was "studiously devoid of genuine excitement".
- Genesis Awards (2010) – Best Documentary Feature (won)
- 62nd Writers Guild Awards (2009) – Best Documentary Feature Screenplay (February 20, 2010)
- Directors Guild Awards (2009) – Outstanding Directorial Achievement in Documentary (January 31, 2010)
- National Board of Review – Best Documentary (December 3, 2009)
- 15th BFCA Critics' Choice Awards (2009) – Best Documentary Feature, Critics' Choice Awards in Los Angeles (January 15, 2010)
- Los Angeles Film Critics Association – Best Documentary
- Toronto Film Critics Association Awards (2009) – Best Documentary Feature & Allan King Documentary Award (December 16, 2009)
- Newport Beach Film Festival (2009) – Audience Award for Best Documentary
- New York Film Critics Online (NYFCO) – Best Documentary (December 13, 2009)
- Sheffield Doc/Fest (2009) – The Sheffield Green Award (November 8, 2009)
- Cinema Eye Honors (2009) – Outstanding Achievement In Original Music Score – J. Ralph (nominated) (November 5, 2009)

The film also was named "Best Documentary" by many critics organizations (including the Boston Society of Film Critics, San Diego Film Critics Society, Dallas/Ft. Worth Film Critics Association, Utah Film Critics Association, Florida Film Critics Circle, Houston Film Critics Society, and Denver Film Critics Society), and it was screened at film festivals and social events all around the United States. As the film received more and more recognition, the Oceanic Preservation Society translated their website into multiple languages to cater to interest from around the world.

== See also ==
- Blackfish (film)
- The Whale (2011 film)
- Seaspiracy (2021 film)
