= BlueVoice.org =

U.S. ocean conservation organization

- Founded: 2000
- Founder: Hardy Jones, Ted Danson
- Type: Ocean Conservation
- Location: 10 Sunfish Drive, St. Augustine, FL, 32080, US
- Region served: Worldwide
- Method: Research, Conservation, Documentary Films, White Papers.
- Key people: Hardy Jones (Executive Director)
- Website: www.bluevoice.org

BlueVoice.org is an ocean conservation organization founded in 2000 by Hardy Jones and Ted Danson. Its mission is to protect dolphins, whales and other marine mammals and to raise popular awareness about the plight of the oceans.

BlueVoice campaigns against the hunting of dolphins in Japan and to expose the harmful levels of toxins in the marine environment. Through production of films such as When Dolphins Cry and The Dolphin Defender, BlueVoice has reached millions of people worldwide with its message.

== BlueVoice work ==
BlueVoice combines field research with dolphins, scientific and medical information with television and Internet productions, DVD and networking components to energize the public and governments to effect needed change. Latest efforts include the study of pollution levels and emerging diseases in marine mammals and humans. Correlations have been found between high toxic levels and incidence of cancer, Parkinson's disease, obesity, diabetes and other diseases in humans who consume marine mammals.

BlueVoice executive director Hardy Jones began working more than thirty years ago to stop the hunting of dolphins in Japan.

BlueVoice has published a White Paper entitled "A Shared Fate" – a fifty-page compendium of toxins in the oceans, marine mammals and human beings correlated with associated diseases.

In 2001 a BlueVoice live webcast of the slaughter of 40 pilot whales achieved 300,000 Internet page views and generated a massive international protest.

The NATURE/PBS film, The Dolphin Defender was seen by 4 million people during its first PBS broadcast in May 2005. The program has been rebroadcast repeatedly and is now in international distribution.

== Current projects ==
- Working through films and other forms of multimedia to end the slaughter of dolphins in Japan: BlueVoice has exposed the brutality of the slaughter and the high concentrations of mercury and other heavy metals and organic pollutants in dolphin meat. BlueVoice is expanding its research to include epidemiological information about the town, especially those who eat dolphin meat.
- Publication of version II of "A Shared Fate", a compendium of information on chemical contaminants in the marine food chain, in marine mammals and in human beings. The report documents locations where high levels of pollutants have been found in dolphins and other marine mammals and correlates this to incidence of illness in humans.
- In Greenland BlueVoice has documented the sale of whale meat in commercial channels. A permit has been given by the International Whaling Commission to Greenlandic aboriginals to hunt and consume whales but whale meat is sold in supermarkets and high and low end restaurants. BlueVoice.org is producing a film and multimedia report on the unpermitted commercialization of whale meat in Greenland for presentation at the July 2011 meeting of the IWC.

== Recent recognitions ==
During 2007–2008 Hardy Jones/BlueVoice received the following recognitions:

- Wildscreen Film Festival: Conservation Filmmaker of the Year
- Humane Society of the United States Genesis Award
- Explorers Club: Special Jury Award
- International Wildlife Film Festival: Lifetime Achievement Award
