= Taiji, Wakayama =

Taiji 太地町
- Town
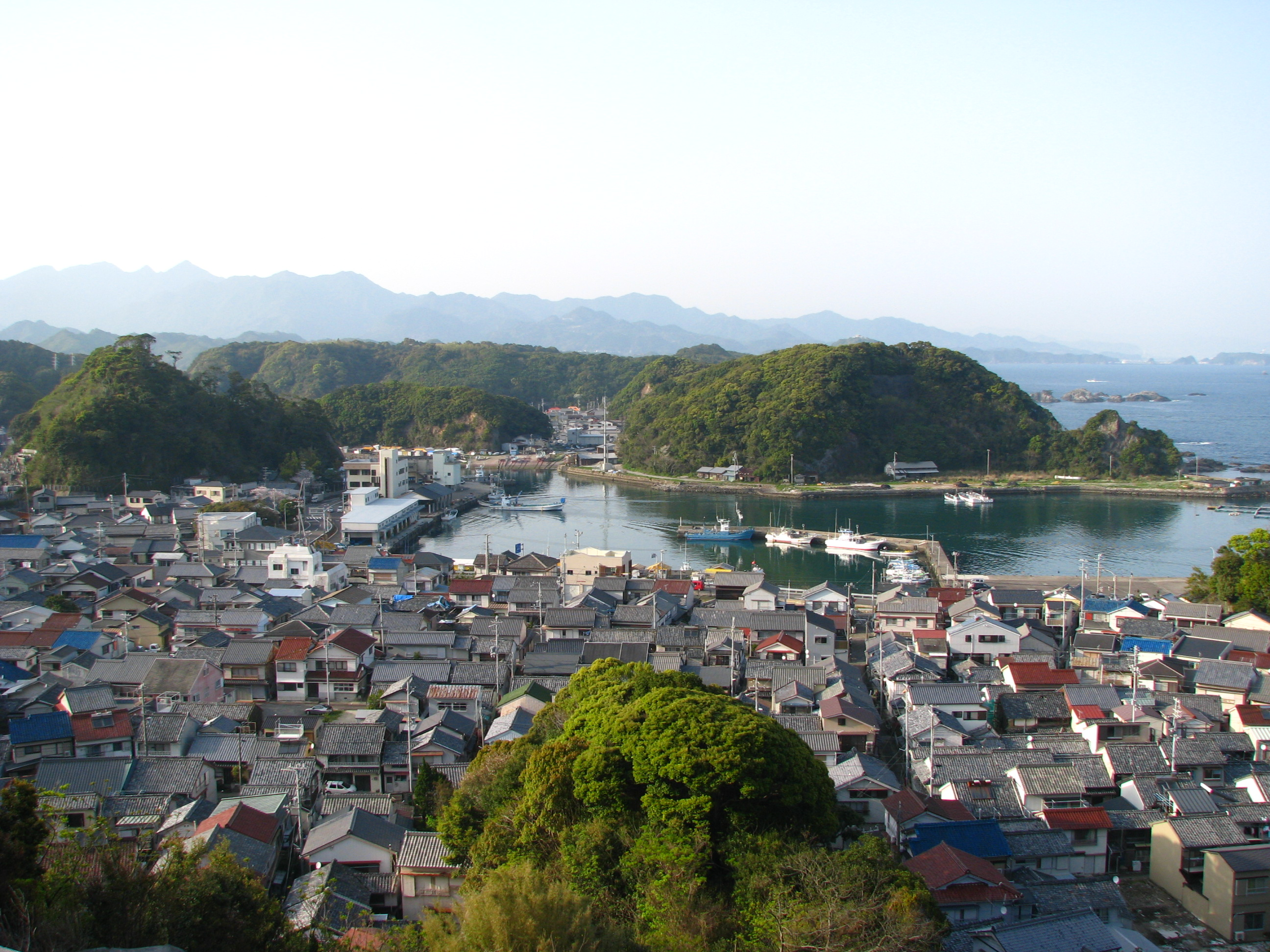
- Central Taiji, as viewed from the south, with the marina in the center and the Pacific is to the right

- Flag Seal

- Location of Taiji in Wakayama Prefecture

- Location in Japan
- Coordinates: 33°36′N 135°57′E
- Country: Japan
- Region: Kansai
- Prefecture: Wakayama
- District: Higashimuro

Government
  - Mayor: Kazutaka Sangen

Area
  - Total: 5.81 km^{2} (2.24 sq mi)

Population (31 August 2021)
  - Total: 2,960
  - Density: 509/km^{2} (1,320/sq mi)
- Time zone: UTC+09:00 (JST)
- City hall address: 3767-1 Taiji, Taiji-cho, Higashimuro-gun, Wakayama-ken 649-5171
- Website: Official website
- Symbols
- Bird: Blue Rock-thrush
- Flower: Grand Crinum Lily
- Tree: Evodia meliifolia

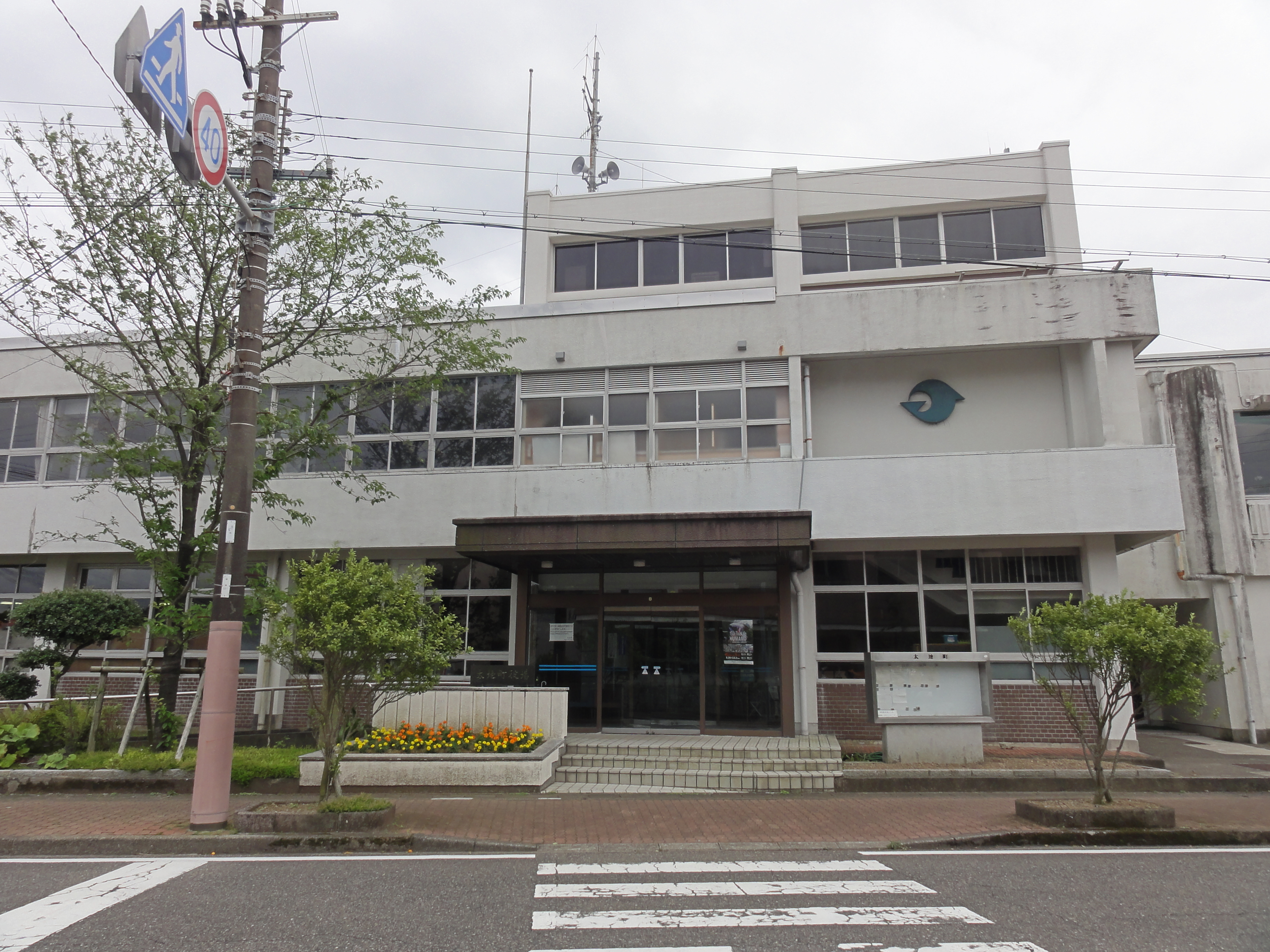
Taiji Town Hall

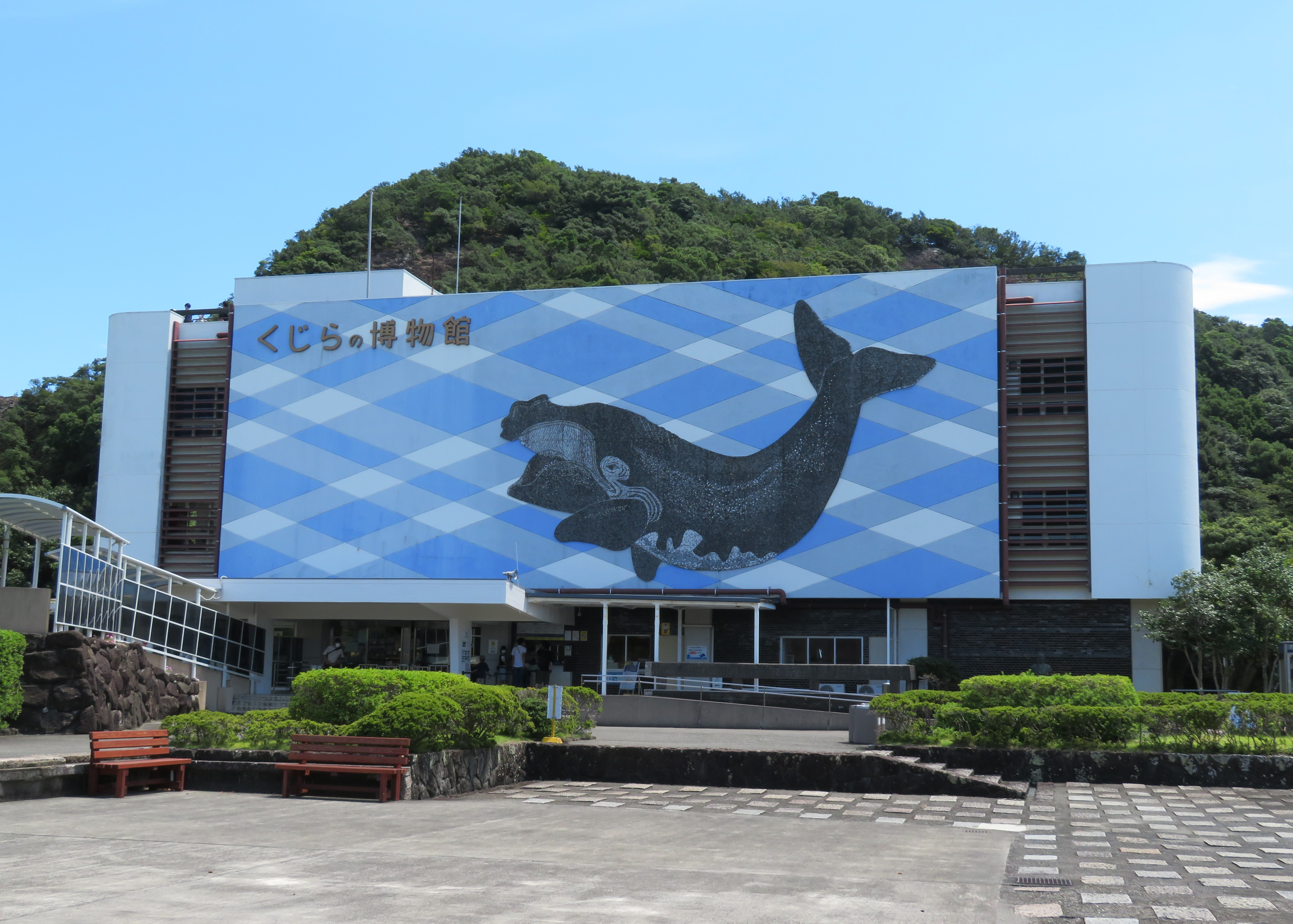
Taiji Whale Museum

Taiji (太地町, Taiji-chō) is a town located in Higashimuro District, Wakayama Prefecture, Japan. As of 1 August 2021, the town had an estimated population of 2960 in 1567 households and a population density of 510 persons per km^{2}. The total area of the town is 255.23 square kilometres (98.54 sq mi). Taiji is the smallest municipality by area in Wakayama Prefecture.

== Geography ==
Taiji is located on a forked peninsula that juts out into the Kumano Sea near the southern tip of the Kii Peninsula, with a rias coastline. On one side is Moriura Bay and on the other is Taiji Bay. It is surrounded by the town of Nachikatsuura on three sides.

=== Neighboring municipalities ===
Wakayama Prefecture

- Nachikatsuura

== Climate ==
Taiji has a humid subtropical climate (Köppen Cfa) characterized by warm summers and cool winters with light to no snowfall. The average annual temperature in Taiji is 16.5 °C. The average annual rainfall is 2564 mm with September as the wettest month. The temperatures are highest on average in August, at around 25.1 °C, and lowest in January, at around 6.8 °C.

== Demographics ==
Per Japanese census data, the population of Taiji has decreased steadily over the past 40 years.

Historical population
Year	Pop.	±%
1920	3,242	—
1930	3,862	+19.1%
1940	3,570	−7.6%
1950	4,656	+30.4%
1960	4,556	−2.1%
1970	4,566	+0.2%
1980	4,539	−0.6%
1990	4,098	−9.7%
2000	3,777	−7.8%
2010	3,251	−13.9%

== History ==
The area of the modern town of Taiji was within ancient Kii Province. Taiji has long been well known as a whaling town and spearheaded the development of more sophisticated whaling techniques in the 17th century. The village of Taiji was established with the creation of the modern municipalities system on April 1, 1889, with the merger of the earlier hamlets of Taiji and Moriura. Taiji was elevated to town status on April 1, 1925. In 1988, a ruling by the International Whaling Commission (IWC) caused Taiji to suspend commercial whaling. However, the town continues to hunt small whales and dolphins. Taiji's annual dolphin hunt is a subject of controversy and the town faces continued pressure from protest groups.

=== Whaling and Taiji ===
Taiji has been primarily known as a whaling town. Japanese traditional whaling techniques were developed here in the 17th century, and the commercial hunting and catching of pilot whales and dolphins remains a major source of income for its residents to this day. Wada Chūbei organized the group hunting system (刺手組) and introduced a new handheld harpoon in 1606. Wada Kakuemon, later known as Taiji Kakuemon, invented the whaling net technique called Amitori hō (網取法) to increase the safety and efficiency of whaling. This method was applied for more than 200 years.

The people of Taiji experienced great loss and economic hardship after an incident in 1878, when a large group of whalers were lost at sea while hunting a whale. The whale was harpooned, but was strong enough to pull the whaling boats out to sea. Refusing to cut the whale loose until it was too late, many whalers drowned or were otherwise adrift and lost at sea as a result. Around one hundred whalers died in the course of this event. After the Russo-Japanese War, Taiji's whaling industry became buoyant again as it became a base for modern whaling. When the practice of Antarctic whaling started, Taiji provided crews for the whaling fleet. In 1988, Taiji suspended commercial whaling as a result of a ruling by the International Whaling Commission (IWC).

==== Dolphin drive hunting ====
Whalers from the town of Taiji continue to hunt small whales such as melon-headed and pilot whales as well as dolphins, commercial activities which are not regulated by the International Whaling Commission. Whalers from Taiji also participate in the annual hunt for minke whales which is sanctioned under IWC regulations for scientific purposes. The number of dolphins available for catch in FY2023 set by the Fisheries Agency was 10,920 for Japan as a whole, and the number of dolphins available for catch allocated to the Taiji dolphin drive hunt was 1824. Of these, the actual number of dolphins caught in Japan as a whole was 614, compared to 492 in the Taiji dolphin hunt.

==== Documentary ====
The town's annual dolphin drive hunt was featured in the 2009 Oscar-winning documentary The Cove. Some people who appeared in the film, including Taiji assemblyman Hisato Ryono, have stated that the documentary's producers lied to them about the film's intended content. Since the film's release, more activists than before, many from outside Japan, have gone to Taiji to observe or protest the annual dolphin slaughter which usually begins in 1 September and continues through the end of February. As a result, the town announced in July 2011 that it was reinforcing its police presence at the cove where the killings take place by operating a 24-hour, 10-man kōban in order to prevent confrontations between activists and locals.

==== Mercury concerns ====
In 2009, hair samples from 1,137 Taiji residents were tested for mercury by the National Institute for Minamata Disease (NIMD). The average amount of methylmercury found in the hair samples was 11.0 parts per million for men and 6.63 ppm for women, compared with an average of 2.47 ppm for men and 1.64 ppm for women in tests conducted in 14 other locations in Japan. From the total population, 182 Taiji residents who showed relatively high mercury levels over 7.2 ppm, including 18 men and 5 women over 50 ppm, underwent further medical testing to check for neurological symptoms of mercury poisoning. None of the Taiji residents displayed any of the traditional symptoms of mercury poisoning, according to the institute. However, the Japan Times reported that the mortality rate for Taiji and nearby Kozagawa, where dolphin meat is also consumed, is over 50% higher in comparison to some other similarly sized villages in other regions of Japan. However, the study makes no mention of specific causes of death nor does it mention relevant age demographics: as Taiji has 1,225 elderly residents (aged 65 years or older) and Kozagawa has 1,531 elderly residents, both towns have more elderly residents, up to twice as many, as towns mentioned in the study, such as Hiezuson, Tottori (699).

The chief of the NIMD, Kōji Okamoto, said, "We presume that the high mercury concentrations are due to the intake of dolphin and whale meat. There were not any particular cases of damaged health, but seeing as how there were some especially high concentration levels found, we would like to continue conducting surveys here." NIMD ran further tests in 2010 and 2011. Hair from 700 Taiji residents were tested for mercury; 117 males and 77 females who showed over 10 ppm underwent further neurological tests. Again, no participant displayed any signs of mercury poisoning. In August 2012, a research project to investigate the health effects of mercury on children was launched by NIMD.

== Government ==
Taiji has a mayor-council form of government with a directly elected mayor and a unicameral town council of 10 members. Taiji, collectively with the other municipalities of Higashimuro District contributes two members to the Wakayama Prefectural Assembly. In terms of national politics, the town is part of Wakayama 3rd district of the lower house of the Diet of Japan.

== Economy ==
Commercial fishing dominates the local economy.

== Education ==
Taiji has one public elementary school and one public middle school operated by the town. The town does not have a high school.

== Transportation ==
=== Railway ===
JR West – Kisei Main Line

- Taiji

=== Highway ===
- National Route 42

== Local attractions ==
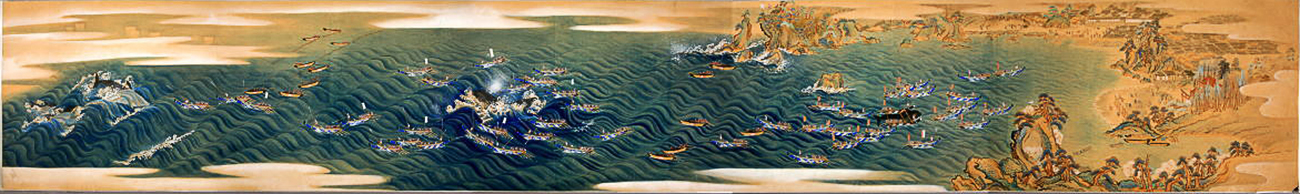
Traditional whaling in Taiji, depicted in a maki-e in the Edo period

=== Museums ===
- Taiji Whale Museum opened in 1969. It exhibits more than 1,000 items related to whales and whaling, including skeletal displays of several whale species. It keeps captive dolphins obtained by the Taiji dolphin drive hunt on display and uses the museum as a transfer station prior to distributing animals to dolphinariums worldwide.
- Hiromitsu Ochiai Baseball Museum commemorates Japanese baseball player Hiromitsu Ochiai who won the Nippon Professional Baseball triple crown three times.
- Ishigaki Museum commemorates painter Eitaro Ishigaki who hailed from Taiji. His wife Ayako founded the museum in 1991.

=== Onsens (hot springs) ===
There are two small-scale onsens (hot springs) in the town:

- Natsusa (or Nassa) Onsen
- Taiji Onsen

=== Festivals ===
Taiji's summer festival is called the Taiji Isana Festival that is held annually on 14 August. Isana is an old Japanese word for whales. Its annual autumn festival is the Taiji Kujira Matsuri ("Taiji Whale Festival"), held on the first Sunday of November. Both festivals are heavily whale-themed and the attractions include the Kujira Odori ("whale dance") and the Kujira Daiko ("whale drumming"). The Kujira Odori is a traditional dance that whalers performed in the past to celebrate a good catch. This dance is unique, as the dancers only move their upper bodies as they dance sitting in whaling boats. It is identified as intangible cultural heritage by Wakayama Prefecture. The Kujira Daiko is also traditional and its performance describes a battle between a large whale and small whaling boats.

== Sister cities ==
- Broome, Western Australia, Australia, since 1981; suspended by the Broome city council in August 2009 in protest against the annual dolphin slaughter. The decision on suspension was reversed in October 2009. Historic ties between the two towns date back to the early 1900s when Japan became instrumental in laying the groundwork of Broome's pearling industry.
- Hakuba, Nagano (Japan), since 1984
- Klaksvík, Faroe Islands, since 2018

== Notable people ==
- Eitaro Ishigaki (1893–1958), an American artist
- Kiwako Taichi (1943–1992), an actress; originally her surname was pronounced Taiji, but she decided to pronounce it Taichi as a stage name.

== See also ==
- Dolphin drive hunting in Japan
- Dolphin meat in Japanese cuisine
- Jūrō Oka—"Father of Japanese Whaling"
- Pilot whale in Japanese cuisine
