= Yushin =

Yushin may refer to:

- The October Restoration, a coup d'etat in the history of South Korea
  - The Yushin Constitution, a constitution established after the coup
- Yushin High School, a high school in Suwon, South Korea
- Yushin Okami, a mixed martial artist
- Sergeant Yushin, referring to either of two fictional characters:
  - An antagonist in the 1985 film Rambo: First Blood Part II
  - A minor character in the 2006 video game Secret Files: Tunguska
- Three Japanese whale catchers:
  - Yūshin Maru
  - Yūshin Maru No. 2
  - Yūshin Maru No. 3
