= MV Shōnan Maru 2 =

Japanese security vessel

History

Japanese Flag
- Name: MV Shōnan Maru 2
- Owner: Kyodo Senpaku Kaisha, LTD.
- Operator: Japanese Fisheries Agency
- Port of registry: Tokyo, Japan.
- Builder: Hitachi Zosen, Osaka
- Launched: 1972
- In service: In service as of 2015
- Identification: IMO number: 7225166; MMSI number: 431934000; Callsign: JFCF
- Status: Active
- Notes: Security Ship for ICR; Water cannons and acoustic weapons both present

General characteristics
- Tonnage: 628 DWT:
- Length: 70.55 m (231 ft)
- Beam: 10.2 m (33.5 ft)
- Draft: 4.763 m (15.6 ft)
- Ice class: None
- Propulsion: 1 x Diesel 4045kilowatts
- Speed: 18 kts Maximum Speed 19knts
- Crew

The Shōnan Maru 2 (第二昭南丸, Daini Shōnan Maru) is a Japanese security vessel, operated by the Japanese Fisheries Agency.

== Sister ships ==
The Shōnan Maru 2 has a sister ship, the Shōnan Maru. The Shōnan Maru was sold to the Misaki Fisheries High School and was replaced by the Yūshin Maru No. 3.

== Design and Appearance ==
The Shōnan Maru 2 is similar in design and appearance to whale catchers used by the ICR such as the Yūshin Maru series, the primary external differences being the presence of a crane near the aft end of her superstructure used to launch and recover rigid-hulled inflatable boats (craft not carried aboard other ICR whale catchers), minor differences in the design of the bridge section and forward catwalk, and the absence of a structure on her prow used to recover fired harpoons. Originally, the Shōnan Maru 2 sported the same blue & white paint scheme as the ICR whale catchers, but in late 2011 she was repainted to an overall white scheme, the word "Research" on the side of her superstructure being replaced with "Government of Japan"

== Altercations with Sea Shepherd Conservation Society ==
In late 2009, the Shōnan Maru 2 intercepted and pursued the MY Steve Irwin, being shown with a water cannon mounted on the bow in place of a harpoon. The ship trailed the Steve Irwin from a distance before closing in and engaging the Sea Shepherd vessel with water cannons and a long-range acoustic device (LRAD).

On January 6, 2010, the vessel was involved in a collision at sea with the MY Ady Gil, which was participating in Sea Shepherd operations against Japanese whaling in the Southern Ocean. Out of the crew of six from the Ady Gil, one New Zealand cameraman sustained broken ribs. The Ady Gil sank soon after. The third vessel at the location, Sea Shepherd's Bob Barker, as well as the Shōnan Maru 2, took footage of the incident. Video of the incident has been released by both Institute of Cetacean Research and Sea Shepherd Conservation Society.

Both sides blamed each other, each stating that the other side miscalculated a maneuver. The New Zealand government expressed concern at the risk of human lives in the hostile environment, and it also repeated its opposition to whaling in the Sanctuary. A spokesman for the Institute of Cetacean Research said that Japan would continue to protect their operations "in whatever way it can" and that further clashes would be likely unless Sea Shepherd stopped its operations.

On January 9, 2010, Sea Shepherd lodged a piracy complaint against the captain and the crew of the Shōnan Maru 2 in the Dutch courts.

An investigation into the collision by the Australian Maritime Safety Authority (AMSA) was inconclusive and unable to assign blame for the collision. AMSA was unable to verify claims made by Sea Shepherd, while the Japanese government declined to participate with the investigation, saying any information it had might be needed for an inquiry by its own authorities.

On February 15, 2010, Peter Bethune, then member of the Sea Shepherd Conservation Society and the skipper of the Ady Gil, boarded the Shōnan Maru 2 without permission. He used a jet ski to approach the ship and then climbed onto its deck after cutting through an anti-boarding net that was draped around the hull. He presented the captain of the whaler with a claim for $3 million for damages that the Ady Gil had suffered. He was transported to Tokyo, where the Japan Coast Guard charged him with vessel invasion.

On January 7, 2012, three Australians from Forest Rescue boarded the Shōnan Maru 2 off the coast of Bunbury, Australia, within the Australian contiguous zone (16.2 miles from shore) without authorisation. The three suspects were detained on the vessel accordingly. The Australian government said on January 9 that it was negotiating for the release of the campaigners. On January 10, Japan and Australia reached an agreement to return the activists without charging them of any offense. The activists were then transferred to the Australian Customs and Border Protection Service vessel Ocean Protector.

== Seizure by Russia ==
On 15 August 2014, the vessel and its crew were being held in Russia after it entered Russian territorial waters without permission. One week later, on 26 August 2014, Shōnan Maru No. 2 was allowed to leave Russia after paying a fine of 30,000 rubles ($830 USD).

== See also ==
- Whaling in Japan
- Whale Wars
