= Tokyo Two =

Greenpeace anti-whaling activists

The Tokyo Two are Greenpeace anti-whaling activists Junichi Sato and Toru Suzuki, who were arrested for stealing whale meat which they presumed was embezzled, from a shipping depot in Aomori Prefecture, Japan in 2008.

== Theft and investigation ==
In 2008, Sato and Suzuki, acting on a tip from an informant who claimed to be a member of a whaling crew, intercepted a box of whale meat at a Seino Transportation Company delivery depot in Aomori, and handed it over to the police as evidence of a theft ring within the whaling industry. Japan says the industry is for scientific research but receives criticism for the meat being sold in shops and restaurants. Sato and Suzuki held a news conference, intending to expose what they called embezzlement of whale meat. An investigation was opened, but no charges were brought against the whalers after the investigators found that the meat was intended as souvenirs and was not sold. Seino submitted a breakage report to Aomori Police.

== Arrest and trial ==
About a month after the news conference, Sato and Suzuki were arrested and charged with theft and trespassing. According to the activists, they were detained by police for 26 days, and were held without charge for 23 days. During that time, they also said they were questioned without a lawyer, tied to chairs, and interrogated for up to 12 hours a day. According to a United Nations human rights group, their treatment by Japanese authorities was arbitrary and contravened elements of the Universal Declaration of Human Rights and the International Covenant on Civil and Political Rights. Amnesty International also expressed its concern about their treatment and suggested that the detention and charges against Sato and Suzuki may have been aimed at intimidating activists. During his interrogation by police, Suzuki claims he was compared to the Aum Supreme Truth group, which committed poison gas attacks on the Tokyo subway. The two activists faced up to 18 months in prison. Sato stated on June 24, 2010, that, while he thinks that he and Suzuki will be convicted, he has no regrets, because he asserts that the "wrong-doing" had to be exposed.

On September 6, 2010, they were found guilty of trespassing and of stealing whale meat they presume to have been illegally diverted from whaling research for personal profit. They were sentenced to one year in prison by the Aomori District Court, but the sentences were suspended for three years. They appealed the ruling on the basis that activists should not be punished for uncovering wrongdoing. On July 12, 2011, the Sendai Appellate Court rejected their appeal.

== Anti-whaling views expressed by Sato ==
Prior to the alleged theft of whale meat, at a news conference outside the 2007 International Whaling Commission (IWC) meeting, Sato expressed support for aggressive confrontations between anti-whaling groups and whalers in the Southern Ocean. Sato now believes that anti-whaling organizations should not engage in annual confrontations with whaling expeditions in the Southern Ocean, and should instead focus on "campaigning with words". Furthermore, he argues that outside groups which wish to change whaling in Japan need to understand that any change that happens will occur slowly, but that such changes are possible and currently occurring.

== See also ==
- Factory ship
- Institute of Cetacean Research
- International Convention for the Regulation of Whaling
- Kyodo Senpaku
- Whaling
- Whaling controversy
- Whaling in Japan
