= Jūrō Oka =

- 岡 十郎
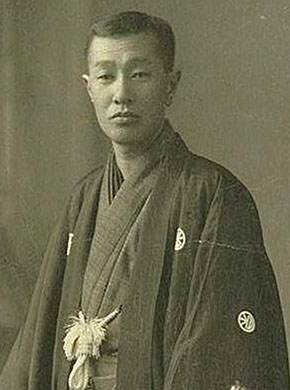
- Jūrō Oka (27 July 1870 - January 1923)
- Born: July 27, 1870; Yamaguchi Prefecture, Japan
- Died: January 8, 1923 (aged 52); Empire of Japan
- Known for: Businessman, "Father of Japanese whaling"

Jūrō Oka (岡 十郎 Oka Jūrō, 27 July 1870 – 8 January 1923) was a Japanese businessman considered the "father of Japanese whaling".

In the 1890s Oka travelled to the West to acquire whaling techniques and equipment, and in 1899 established Nihon En'yō Gyogyō K.K., which caught its first whale the following year with Norwegian gunner. Whaling in Japan grew rapidly and competition was fierce. In 1908 Oka became the first president of the Japan Whaling Association. Oka declared Japan would "become one of the greatest whaling nations in the world ... The day will come when we shall hear one morning that whales have been caught in the Arctic and in the evening that whales are being hunted in the Antarctic."

== Life and career ==
Following the Meiji Restoration of 1868, Japan went through a period of rapid modernization, and many were sent to the West to bring back knowledge and technology. The nation began to assert its authority in the Far East, which was to lead to the colonization of Korea and Taiwan. The Russian Empire dominated whaling in the region, which added political motivations to Japanese whaling.

Oka visited the government in Tokyo with a plan to modernize whaling. The government agreed to it, and he set off for Norway, where he purchased whaling equipment at 10% above the prices asked to ensure early delivery to Japan. He studied the practicalities of whaling in Finnmark and made trips to the Azores to observe traditional methods and to the Newfoundland Colony to observe modern methods which had just begun to be used there. He concluded that the Norwegians had a superior system, but that Japan could not adopt it as-is given that the Norwegians whaled primarily for oil, the Japanese for meat.

Oka returned to Japan and in Yamaguchi Prefecture on 20 July 1899 established the whaling company Nihon En'yō Gyogyō K.K., nicknamed the Ichimaru Kaisha after its logo: the Chinese character for the number one (一 ichi) within a circle (maru). Oka was managing director. Oka's was not the first modern whaling corporation in Japan: Hogei Gumi had preceded it by a year, but had found little success and closed in 1900.

Japan was in financial straits following the First Sino-Japanese War (1894–95) so Oka found it difficult to raise the 100,000 yen necessary for the enterprise. The company applied for a whaling licence from Korea, which was difficult to obtain as the Korean court was under the influence of the Russian Empire. A three-year licence was granted, restricted to three locations at 600 yen per whaler. For reasons of prestige, the company had the whaler built in Japan: the Daiichi Chōshū Maru (第一長州丸, completed 30 November 1899), named after Chōshū Domain, which was Yamaguchi Prefecture's name before the Meiji Restoration. The company hired an experienced Norwegian gunner, Morten Pedersen, who shot the company's first whale—a blue whale—on 4 February 1900.

The company turned its first profit the following year, by which point it had added a whaler, the Olga, leased from an Anglo-Russian company. Nihon En'yō Gyogyō faced near ruin when the Daiichi Chōshū Maru was wrecked on the coast of Korea in a blizzard on 2 December 1901; the ship was uninsured, as no insurance company had been willing to cover it. The Olga's catch the following year nearly covered the losses, though, and the company survived.

Oka began to charter the Norwegian whalers Rex and Regina; Norwegian companies were unable otherwise to obtain whaling licenses in the region. In 1904 the company purchased the Olga and reorganized as Tōyō Gyogyō (東洋漁業) with capital of 500,000 yen.

Oka obtained a concession from the Korean government on 11 January 1904; as Russian whaling ceased during the Russo-Japanese War (1904–05) Oka had a de facto monopoly in Korean waters for the war's duration, which he expanded with the lease of three Russian stations on 1 May 1905. Japan's success in the war opened Eastern waters and allowed the company to expand. It began purchasing new whalers in 1906, the first of which was the Norwegian-built Togo, and soon became the most profitable whaling company worldwide. Its success inspired other Japanese whaling companies, with similar success. Competition was fierce, and whaling companies fought to secure the best whalers, until the government threatened to intervene; to calm this strife, Oka led a series of conferences in mid-1908 that led to the establishment of the Japan Whaling Association on 18 December 1908, based in Osaka with Oka as its first president. The Association restricted the number of whalers within Japanese waters and had heavy penalties for breaches of its code.

On 2 May 1910 Japan's four largest whaling companies merged with two smaller ones to form the Tōyō Hogei K.K. (東洋捕鯨, "Oriental Whaling Company"). Oka declared Japan would "become one of the greatest whaling nations in the world ... The day will come when we shall hear one morning that whales have been caught in the Arctic and in the evening that whales are being hunted in the Antarctic." Other companies went bankrupt, and still others partook in mergers, until by the 1930s the large company Taiyō Gyogyō (大洋漁業) had absorbed them all.
