= Kyodo Senpaku =

Consolidation of Japanese fisheries

Kyodo Senpaku (共同船舶, Kyōdō Senpaku), formed in 1987 (formerly Kyodo Hogei, since 1976), is a consolidation of earlier whaling departments of Japanese fisheries. The for-profit company conducts the collection, processing and wholesale of the whale byproducts on behalf of the Institute of Cetacean Research, in accordance with IWC Article VIII which specifically requires the byproducts to be sold and used. In 2000, it had nine vessels and its main income was $45M of fees from the institute.

== See also ==
- Whaling
- Whaling in Japan
- Institute of Cetacean Research
