= Yushin Maru No. 3 =

Japanese whaler

- A render of the Yūshin Maru type whale catcher.

History

Japan
- Name: Yushin Maru
- Owner: Kyodo Senpaku Kaisha, Ltd.
- Operator: Institute of Cetacean Research
- Port of registry: Tokyo, Japan
- Builder: Naikai Shipbuilding & Engineering, Setoda
- Launched: 3 July 2007
- Identification: IMO number: 9414096, Call sign: 7JCH; MMSI number: 432621000
- Status: in active service

General characteristics
- Type: Whaler
- Tonnage: 742 gross tonnage (GT)
- Length: 69.61 m (228.4 ft) o/a
- Beam: 11 m (36 ft 1 in) (moulded)
- Height: 19.5 m (64 ft)
- Draft: 5 m (16 ft 5 in)
- Installed power: 5280 PS / 3900 kW
- Crew: 8

The Yushin Maru No. 3 (第三勇新丸, Daisan Yūshin Maru) is a Japanese-registered whale catcher that undertakes whaling operations in the North Pacific Ocean and Southern Ocean. Along with other vessels of the Japanese whaling fleet she has been featured on American television, in the documentary-style reality series Whale Wars.

Yūshin Maru No. 3 was built in 2007 and replaced the Kyo Maru No. 1, which was later preserved as a museum ship in Taiji, Japan.

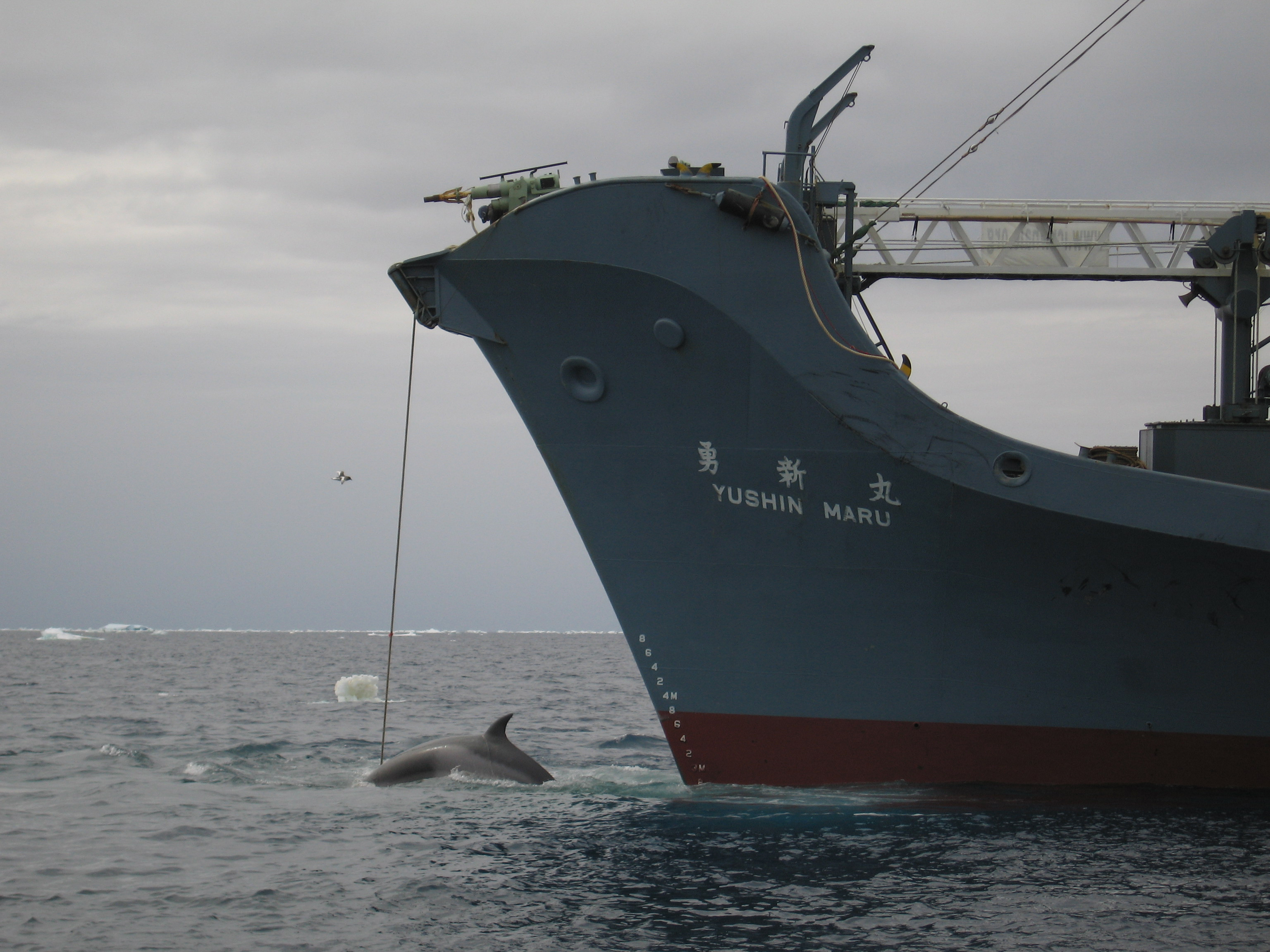
Sister ship Yūshin Maru with a Whale

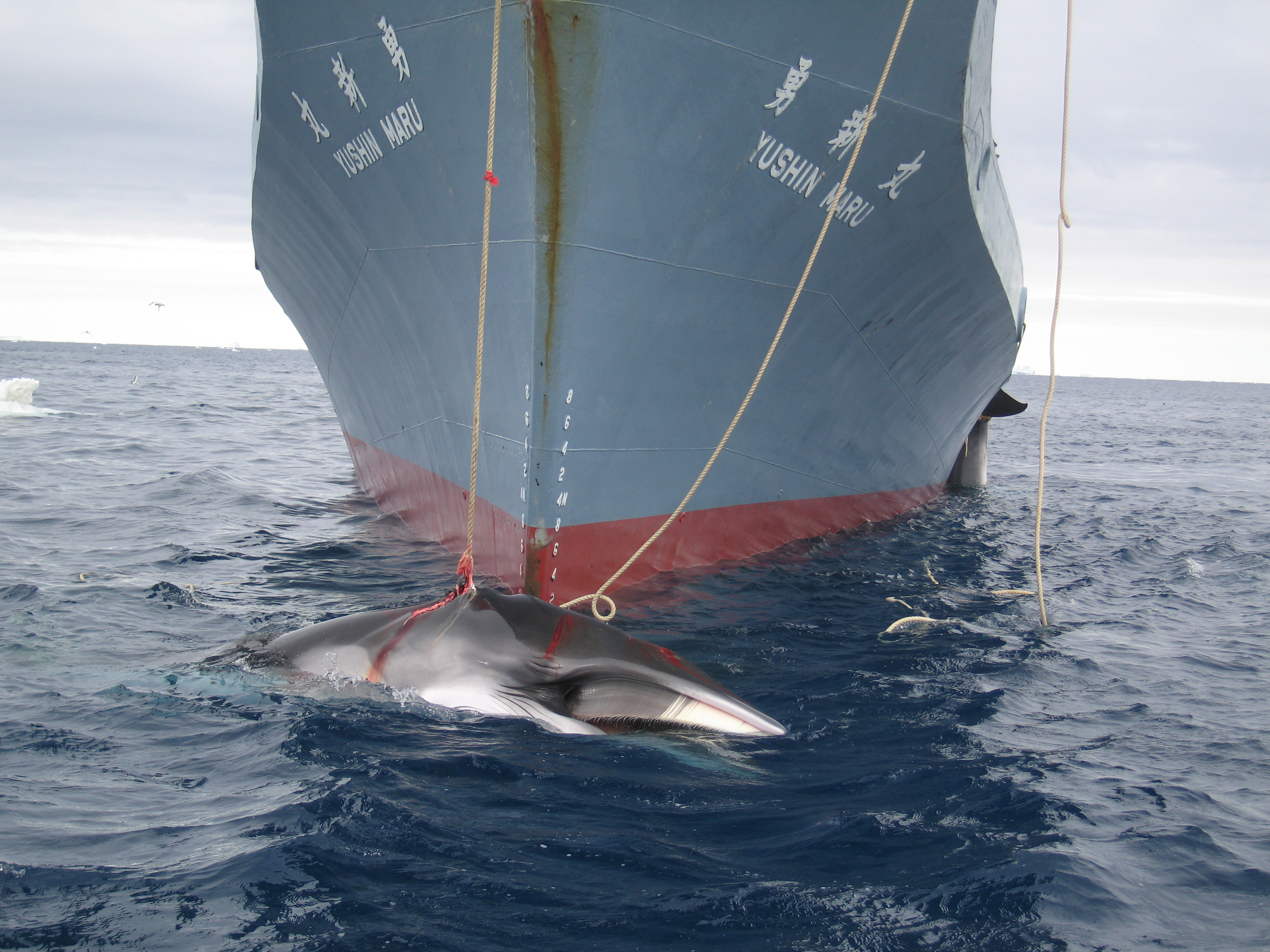
Sister ship Yūshin Maru with a Whale

== See also ==
- Whaling in Japan
- Institute of Cetacean Research
