= Whaling in Japan =

Commercial hunting of whales in Japan

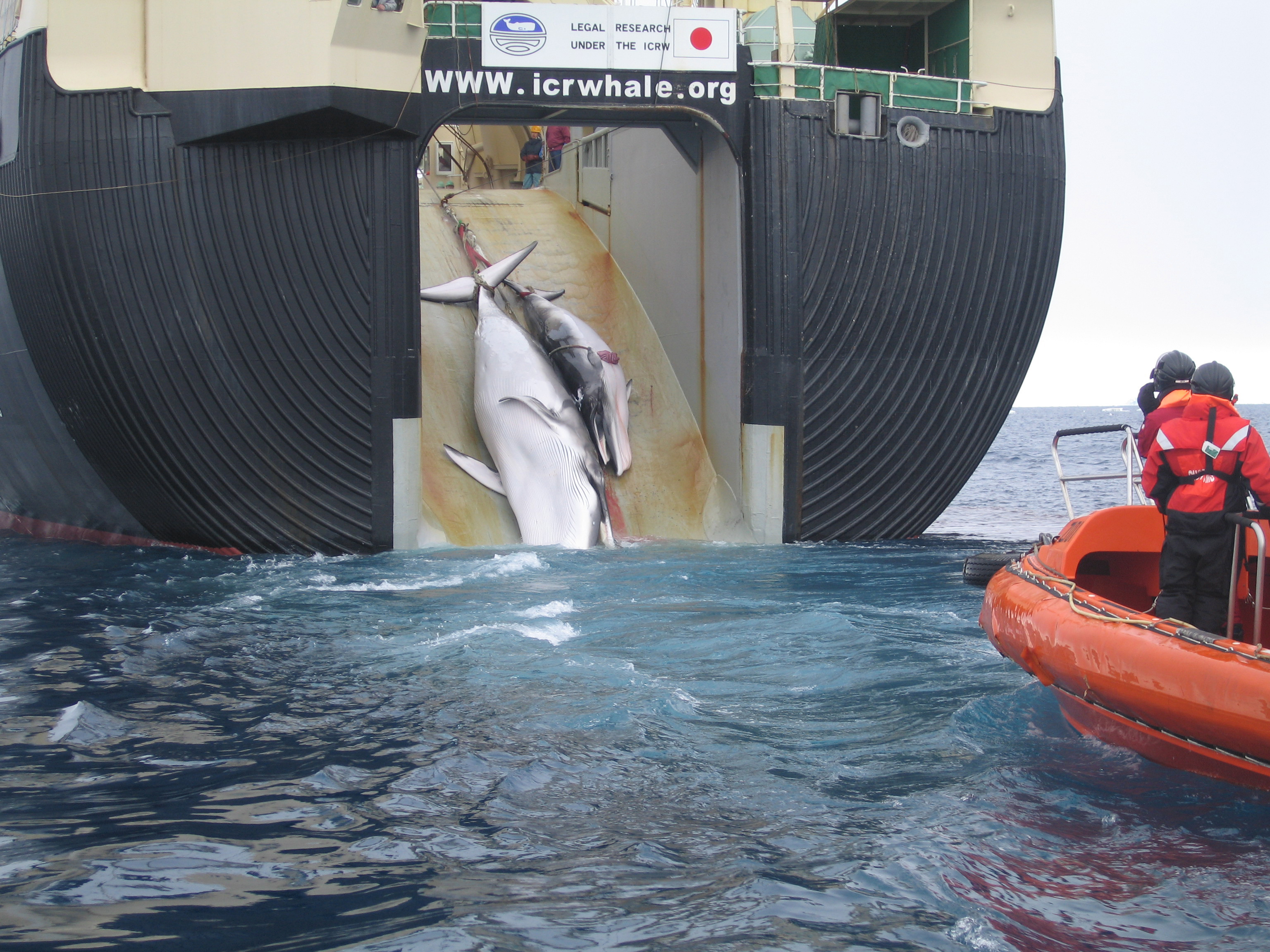
A whale and a sub-adult being loaded aboard a factory ship, the Nisshin Maru. The sign above the slipway reads, "Legal research under the ICRW." Australia released this photo to challenge that claim.

Japanese whaling, in terms of active hunting of whales, is estimated by the Japan Whaling Association to have begun around the 12th century. However, Japanese whaling on an industrial scale began around the 1890s when Japan started to participate in the modern whaling industry, at that time an industry in which many countries participated.

During the 20th century, Japan was heavily involved in commercial whaling. This continued until the International Whaling Commission (IWC) moratorium on commercial whaling went into effect in 1986. Japan continued to hunt whales using the scientific research provision in the agreement, and Japanese whaling was conducted by the Institute of Cetacean Research. This was allowed under IWC rules, although most IWC members opposed it. However, in March 2014, the UN's International Court of Justice ruled that the Japanese whaling program called "JARPA II" in the Southern Ocean, including inside the Australian Whale Sanctuary, was not in accordance with the International Convention for the Regulation of Whaling, and was not for scientific purposes, as it had claimed. They ordered Japan to cease operations. In response to the ruling, Japan formulated a new Antarctic research whaling program, "NEWREP-A", to replace JARPA II. Under this program, 333 Antarctic minke whales were hunted each year from 2015 to 2018. On 1 July 2019, Japan withdrew from the IWC and resumed commercial whaling, claiming that the IWC's original goal of sustainable whaling had been lost. As a result, Japanese whaling will now only take place in Japan's territorial waters and exclusive economic zones, moving away from the high seas in order to avoid trade violations under CITES. In 2024, Japan hunted 179 Bryde's whales, 87 minke whales, 30 fin whales, and 25 sei whales.

Antarctic hunts were a source of conflict between pro- and anti-whaling countries and organizations. Antarctic minke whales' abundance in the East Antarctic Ocean may have remained stable or declined slightly during JARPA, but this is thought to be due to a decline in krill as a result of the increase in humpback whales. The International Union for Conservation of Nature (IUCN), on the other hand, listed it as Near Threatened (NT) in 2018. The UN's International Court of Justice, in addition to other countries, scientists, and environmental organizations, consider the Japanese research program to be unnecessary and lacking scientific merit, and describe it as a thinly disguised commercial whaling operation. Japan, echoing Norway's arguments on its own whaling activities, also argues it is entitled to continue whaling because of whaling's place in its cultural heritage. The whale meat from these hunts is sold in shops and restaurants, and is showcased at an annual food festival that, in some cases, features the butchering of a whale for onlookers. A poll in 2014 found that few Japanese people have been eating whale meat regularly since whale-based dishes disappeared from school lunches in 1987.

== History ==
Archeological evidence in the form of whale remains discovered in burial mounds suggests that whales have been consumed in Japan since the Jōmon period (between c. 14,000 and 300 BCE). Without the means to engage in active whaling, consumption at that time primarily stemmed from stranded whales. Surviving Ainu folklore reveals a long history of whaling and a spiritual association with whales. The earliest records of hand-thrown harpoons date from the 12th century.

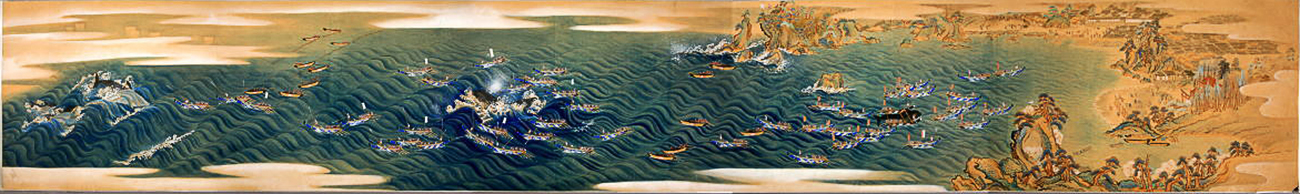
Inshore whaling in Taiji, Japan

=== Organized whaling ===
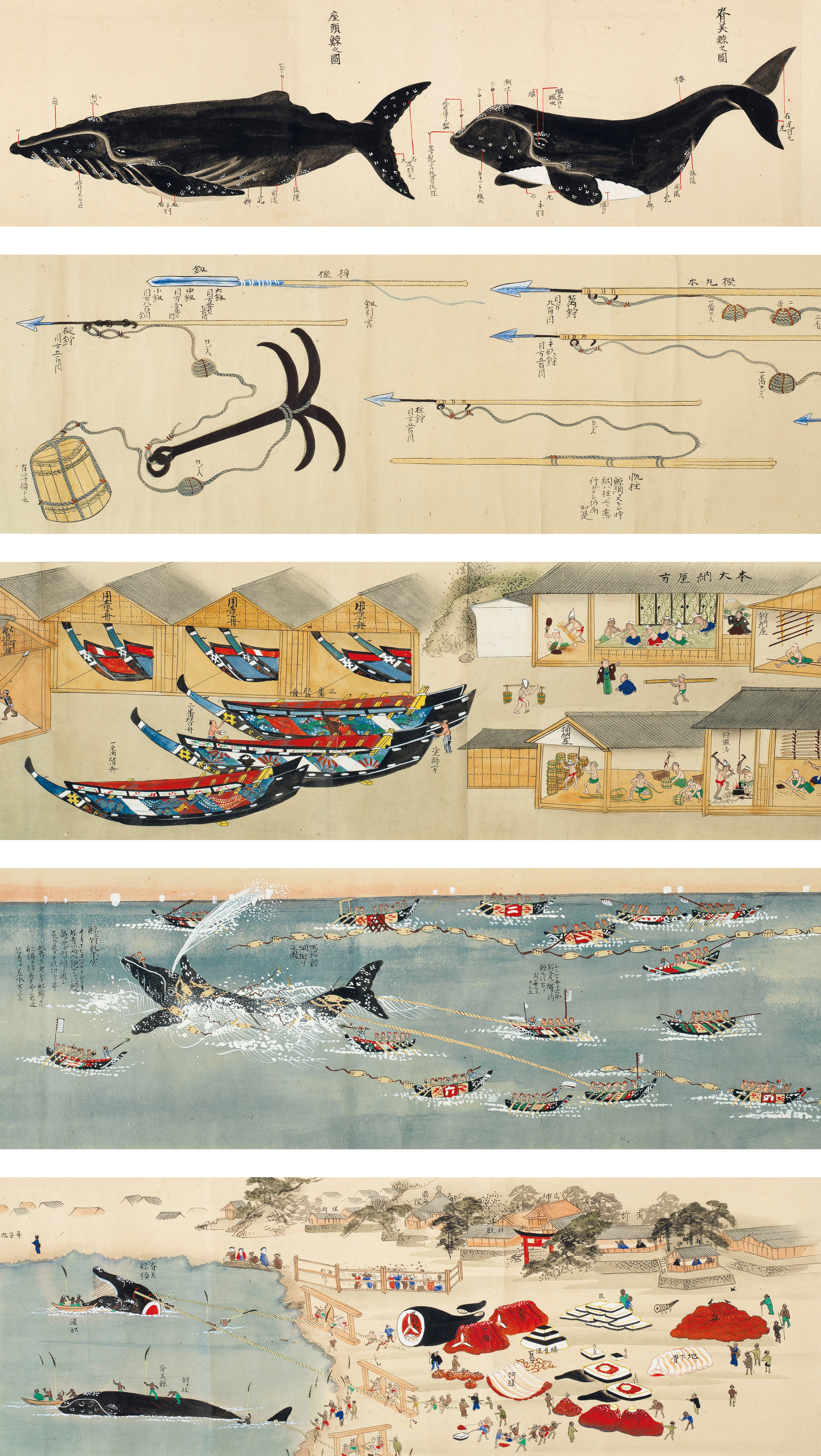
Illustrations of the whaling techniques of Taiji, Japan, in 1857

Organized open-boat shore whaling began in the 1570s, and continued into the early 20th century. Techniques were developed in the 17th century in Taiji, Wakayama. Wada Chubei Yorimoto established a fishery by organizing the group hunting system in 1606. Whalers would spot whales from stations along the shore and launch boats to catch them with harpoons and lances. His grandson, Wada Kakuemon Yoriharu, later known as Taiji Kakuemon Yoriharu, invented the whaling net technique called amitori-shiki (網取り式).

Instead of trying to harpoon whales in open water, now twenty or more boats would encircle a whale and make a racket, driving it towards the shallows into nets wielded by a second group of six boats. There harpooners would approach in four boats of their own. The nets made escape more difficult and, in its struggle to escape, the whale got tired sooner.

Primarily right whales, humpback whales, gray, and fin whales were hunted. Blue whales, sei, Bryde's and sperm whales were however also taken when possible.

Once ashore, the whale was quickly flensed and divided into its separate parts for various warehouses and further processing. Although the primary use for whales was meat, the entire whale was used in a variety of products including lamp oil, soaps, fertilizer, folding fans (baleen), and more. This method of whaling required a significant financial investment from rich individuals to compensate for the sizable labor force. However, whaling remained entwined with ritual and unlike their contemporary European counterparts the early Japanese coastal whalers considered whales a valuable resource and did not over-exploit local stocks.

Domestically, Japanese writers have tried to call attention to historical whale declines due to whaling practices by other nations over hundreds of years, some of which continue today, and assert that motives and objectives of Japanese whaling customs differ from other nations. Supporters of the Japanese whaling tradition claim that the experience is both humble and emotional, and all parts of a whale are used, unlike westerners of the past who hunted only for whale oil. In addition, Japan has strictly controlled catch quotas, and whalers have never hunted juveniles or cow/calf pairs due to their respect for whales. When they kill whales, hunters invoke the Buddha and pray for the repose of whales' souls; they held funerals for whales, built cenotaphs for them, gave posthumous Buddhist names to them, and when a dead fetus is removed from a butchered cow, an effort is made to release it into the sea. These practices are intended to encourage emotionally healthy or spiritual relationships with whales, and are connected with Japanese religious beliefs.

Even though Buddhists were opposed to hunting whales, due to the whales' great care for their calves, enforcement of the Shorui-Awaremi-no-rei (ordinances of animal protection) excluded whales due to being perceived locally as fish, despite the fulfillment of terms of protection for having "mammalian natures", and that a paper regarding whales as mammals was published in Kyoto in 1758. As a precept, Buddhists and other concerned people created folklore tales about whaling communities and those who practiced whaling on an industrial scales met tragic downfalls by supernatural phenomenon such as phantoms and the curses of whales.

North Pacific right whales followed by grays and humpbacks were considered to be the primary targets, and the industries were devastating to the stocks as catch quantities had been reduced dramatically in relatively short periods. The effect of the industries were more notable on the whale populations than the later American whaling. This decline of coastal stocks resulted not only in financial solvency of many industrial groups but also in disputes between feudal domains in western Japan that required the intervention of the shogunate. As early as the Edo period, Japanese writers may have tried to call attention to overkill by American and Norwegian whalers, whose hunting practices led to depletion of whale populations, and the tragedy called Semi-nagare, an incident in which over 100 Taiji whalers were lost in the ill-timed pursuit of the only two whales they had seen in December 1878. The incident effectively marked the end of traditional Japanese whaling practice.

Some areas of Japan did not whale and opposed whaling, in particular in Northeast Japan where Japanese fishermen believed that whales were an incarnation of the god Ebisu.

=== Modernization ===
The modernization of Japanese whaling began with the adaptation of Western whaling methods around 1860. In 1861, the Tokugawa shogunate dispatched Nakahama Manjirō to the Bonin Islands on a Western-style schooner to practice whaling in the manner of the Western or "Yankee" whalers that were active in the West Pacific at that time. From whalers that had settled in the Bonin Islands, Manjirō purchased new tools such as the bomb lance, an explosive projectile that was used in whaling.

Norwegian-style modern whaling, based on the use of power-driven vessels, cannons and exploding harpoons, was introduced in the Meiji period largely through the efforts of Jūrō Oka who is considered the "father of modern Japanese whaling". Oka traveled the world gathering information about whaling practices including to Norway for harpoons, cannons and expertise. He also established the first modern whaling company in Japan in 1899, Nihon Enyo Gyogyo K.K. which took its first whale on February 4, 1900, with a Norwegian gunner, Morten Pedersen.

In the early 20th century, Jūrō Oka dominated the whale meat market in Japan with assistance and instruction from Norwegian whalers and their leased or purchased ships. Another boost was provided by the capture of a Russian whaling fleet and subsequent transfer to Toyo GyoGyo Co. Ltd. As imperial Japan's whaling industry expanded into the new territory opened up by their colonization of Korea and Taiwan, Oka's company (renamed Toyo Hogei K.K.) returned significant profits to its investors which led to increased Japanese competition. Oka later became the first president of the Japan Whaling and Fishing Association, established in 1908.

I am firmly convinced that we shall become one of the greatest whaling nations in the world. The whaling grounds round Korea and Japan offer unlimited possibilities, and should stocks of whales, contrary to expectations, fail in those areas, we have the Sea of Okhotsk and the Bering Sea to the north and we are aware of the great treasure houses to the south. The day will come when we shall hear one morning that whales have been caught in the Arctic and in the evening that whales are being hunted in the Antarctic.

Jūrō Oka, 1910

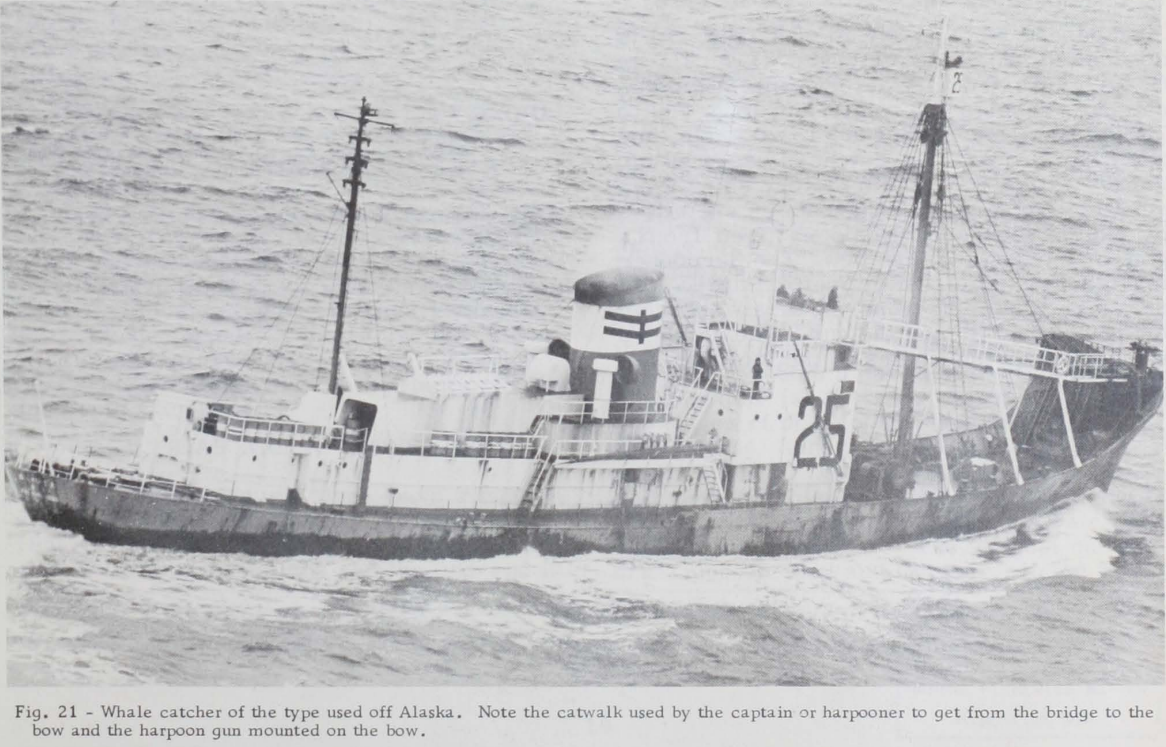
Japanese whale catcher in the waters off Alaska (c. 1970)

Modernization efforts continued through the mid 20th century. Japanese whalers began to operate in specialized whaling fleets consisting of 6 to 10 whale catchers serving a factory ship. Catchers could range as far as 200 miles from their factory ship, communicating by marine VHF radio. Catchers could either deliver the whales directly to the factory ship, or float the whale carcass by inflating it with air and buoying it. The catcher would then mark the whale with radio buoys or radar reflectors to help the factory ship find and retrieve it.

==== Reactions to modernization ====
At the start of the 20th century local traditions conflicted with modern whaling practices. In 1911 the conflict turned violent in Same Village, Aomori Prefecture. Ocean pollution from the whaling stations, including large quantities of oil and blood runoff, angered the local fishermen and threatened their own fishing grounds. In protest the fishermen burned a Toyo Hogei facility down. The people of the Same region also did not consume whales and considered them sacred.

The League of Nations raised concerns about the over-exploitation of whale stocks and called for conservation measures in 1925. This eventually led to the Geneva Convention for the Regulation of Whaling which was presented in 1931 but did not enter into force until 1934 and was completely ignored by Japan and Germany.

=== Antarctica ===
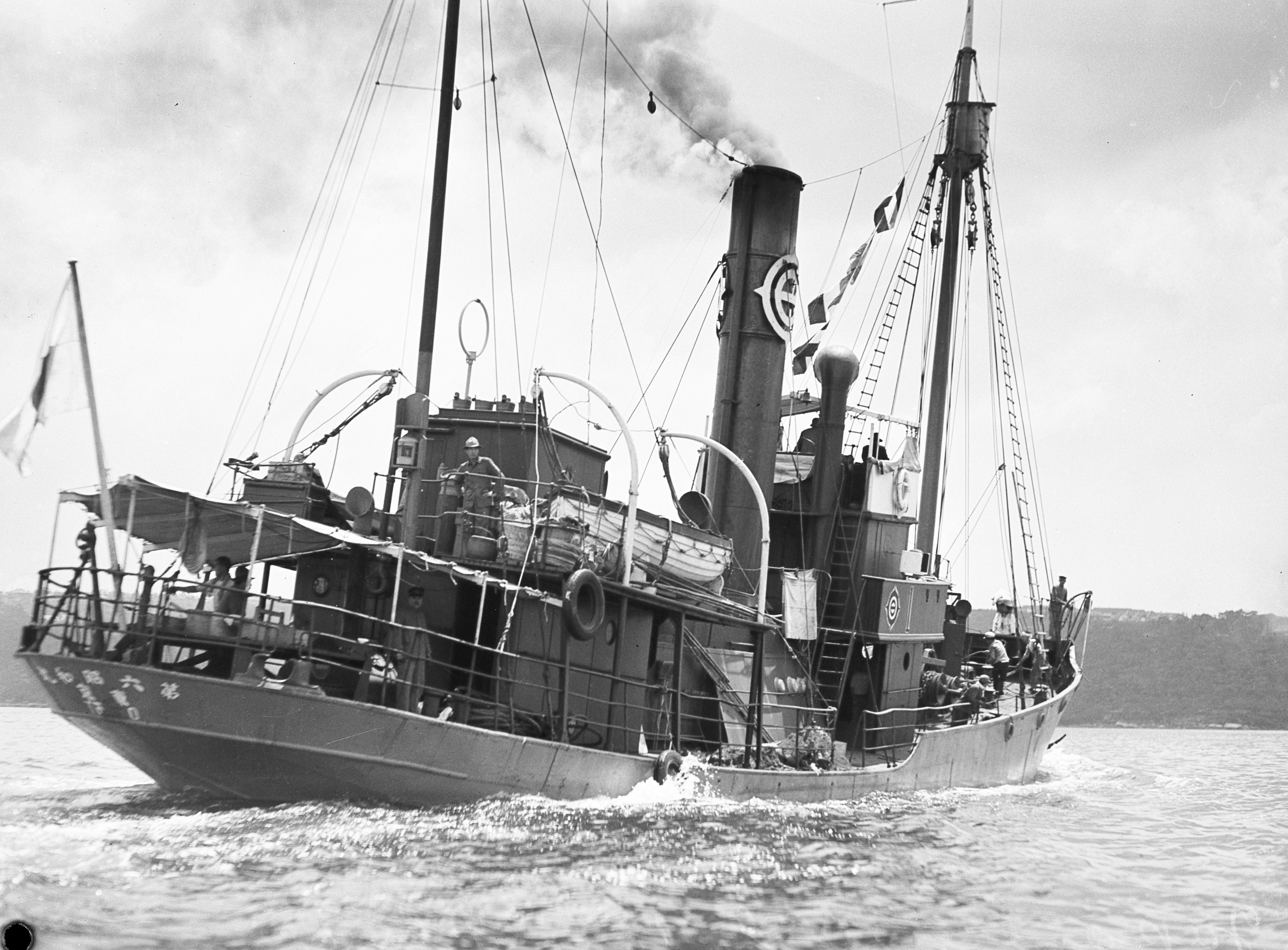
Japanese whale boat, Port Jackson, Sydney, Australia, 1935

Factory ships were not used by Japan until the 1930s. As whale catches diminished in coastal waters, Japan looked to Antarctica. Toyo Hogei K.K. purchased the Norwegian factory ship, Antarctic, renaming it the Tonan Maru in 1934. Refrigerator ships were sent along to freeze and transport the meat back to Japan. By capitalizing on both the meat and oil of whales, the Japanese industry continued to out-compete other whaling nations. Improvements in technology such as the world's first diesel-powered whale catcher, the Seki Maru, also increased the capacity to take whales. In the years building up to World War II, the Germans purchased whale oil from Japan and both nations used it in preparation for war.

In 1937 in London, the International Conference on Whaling, which Japan did not attend, led to additional limits on pelagic whaling in order to prevent excessive exploitation (and specifically the extinction of the blue whale) creating the International Agreement for the Regulation of Whaling. Regarding voluntary acceptance of restrictions:

This is the more important in that Japan, who has not yet acceded to the 1931 Convention is largely increasing her whaling fleet in the Antarctic...

Regardless of efforts to establish limits, in part due to Japan ignoring an 89-day season limit and continuing for 125 days, a record 45,010 whales were taken in a single season. The Protocol to the International Agreement for the Regulation of Whaling, signed in 1938, established additional restrictions on whaling. Despite the attendance of Japanese representatives, Japan did not sign the agreement and started hunting for humpback and undersized whales five weeks prior to the defined start of the season. By 1939 Germany and Japan accounted for 30% of the world's whale take.

In 2016, according to the country's Institute for Cetacean Research, Japan's whaling fleet has killed 333 minke whales in the part of this year's Antarctic whale hunt. Some 230 were female; about 90% of these were pregnant, according to the report.

=== World War II ===
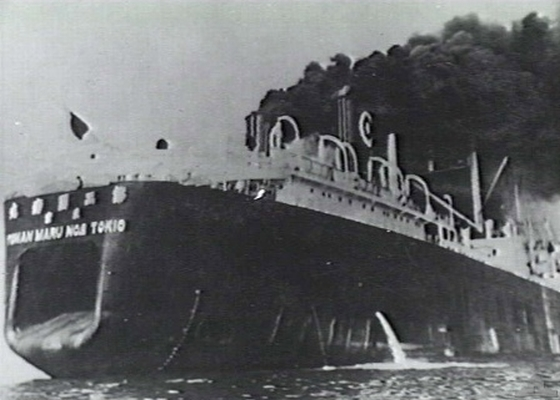
The Tonan Maru No. 2 whaling factory ship, drafted into military use, was damaged by a Dutch submarine while taking part in the landing at Kuching, Borneo.

During the Second World War, Japan's whaling was significantly limited to more familiar hunting grounds, such as the Bonin Islands, to provide meat and oil for domestic and military use. Whaling there was halted in March 1945 when the islands were taken by US forces. By November 1945 the whaling stations received permission to reopen; however, most whaling ships had been commandeered by the Imperial Japanese Navy, and by the end of the war the factory ships and most of the whale catchers had been sunk.

General Douglas MacArthur encouraged the surrendered Japan to continue whaling in order to provide a cheap source of meat to starving people (and millions of dollars in oil for the US and Europe). The Japanese whaling industry quickly recovered as MacArthur authorized two tankers to be converted into factory ships, the Hashidate Maru and the Nisshin Maru. Whale catchers once again took blue whales, fins, humpbacks and sperm whales in the Antarctic and elsewhere.

The first post-war expedition was overseen by a US naval officer, Lieutenant David McCracken, and observed by Australian Kenneth Coonan. Coonan expressed disapproval of McCracken in his reports of violated regulations and waste dumped over the side when the fleet began killing whales faster than they could be processed. McCracken even briefly joined in whaling with the Japanese crew of a whale catcher and detailed the trip in his 1948 book, Four Months on a Jap Whaler.

The post-war recovery established whale meat as a nationwide food source for the first time. In 1947 whale meat made up over 50 percent of the meat consumed in Japan. The market significantly increased through commercial sale and public distribution. In 1954, the School Lunch Act also included whale meat in compulsory education (elementary and middle school) to improve the nutrition of Japanese children.

=== ICRW and IWC ===
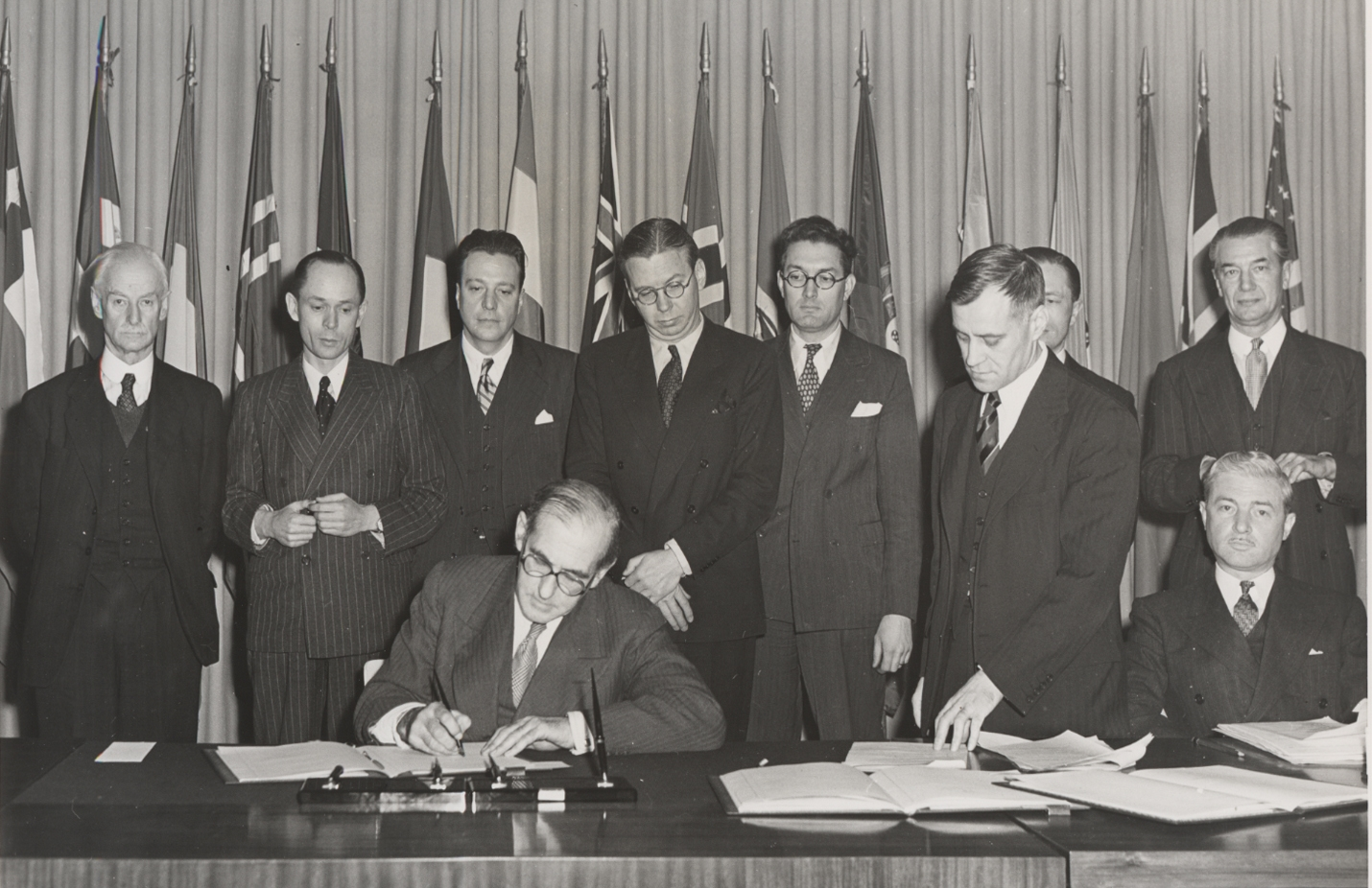
Signing the International Convention for the Regulation of Whaling, Washington, D.C., Dec 2, 1946

The International Convention for the Regulation of Whaling was created in 1946 in Washington to "provide for the proper conservation of whale stocks and thus make possible the orderly development of the whaling industry". Based on the previous 1937 International Agreement and subsequent Protocols to that agreement in 1938 and 1945, the ICRW led to the 1949 creation of the International Whaling Commission and consists of guidelines for the international regulation of coastal and pelagic whaling. Japan joined the IWC in 1951.

Japan would later make heavy use of one particular article of the ICRW despite the condemnation of environmental organizations and anti-whaling nations.

Article VIII

1. Notwithstanding anything contained in this Convention any Contracting Government may grant to any of its nationals a special permit authorizing that national to kill, take and treat whales for purposes of scientific research subject to such restrictions as to number and subject to such other conditions as the Contracting Government thinks fit, and the killing, taking, and treating of whales in accordance with the provisions of this Article shall be exempt from the operation of this Convention. Each Contracting Government shall report at once to the Commission all such authorizations which it has granted. Each Contracting Government may at any time revoke any such special permit which it has granted.

2. Any whales taken under these special permits shall so far as practicable be processed and the proceeds shall be dealt with in accordance with directions issued by the Government by which the permit was granted.

As the IWC enacted regulation regarding whaling a number of unregulated operations acting outside of the laws of member nations became notorious in the mid-late 20th century. For example, a large private whaling fleet was owned (through a variety of holding companies and flags of convenience) by shipping magnate Aristotle Onassis and gained notoriety for ignoring all limits of size and species. When the Peruvian navy finally stopped and seized the Onassis fleet in 1954, and just as sanctions were to be applied, the entire fleet was sold to Japan for $8.5 million. Onassis' factory ship, the Olympic Challenger, was renamed the Kyokuyo Maru II.

The Japanese trawler, Shunyo-maru, later became a combined catcher/factory whaling ship, MV Tonna, and was owned by Andrew M. Behr who also owned the whaling ship, Sierra. The Tonna is famous for its demise. In 1978 with full holds the Tonna landed another 50 ton fin whale. As the whale was being winched aboard for processing the ship listed over, took on water and quickly sank. Behr and the Sierra were also linked to Japan's Taiyo Fisheries Co. through a Canadian subsidiary (Taiyo Canada Ltd.) and with whale product for Japanese markets. In July 1979, the Sierra was severely damaged after being rammed by activist Paul Watson aboard his ship, the Sea Shepherd. The Sierra was later (February 1980) sunk in port by unknown saboteurs with limpet mines. Taiyo and other Japanese fisheries have also been linked to whaling through subsidiary companies in Taiwan, the Philippines, Spain, South Korea, Chile and Peru.

=== Consolidation ===
As quotas and resources were reduced and restrictions increased, the commercial viability of large competing whaling fleets was also diminished. In order to preserve the industry, six Japanese whaling companies negotiated an agreement through the Japan Fisheries Agency in July 1975. The six companies (Nihon Suisan, Taiyo Gyogyo, Kyokuyo, Nitto Hogei, Nihon Hogei and Hokuyo Hogei) merged to create a new company, Nihon Kyodo Hogei Co., Ltd. on February 15, 1976. Former president of the Japan Fisheries Association and former Director-General of the Japan Fisheries Agency, Iwao Fujita, became the first managing director by appointment.

In April 1976, Shintaro Abe, the Minister of Agriculture, Forestry and Fisheries, declared government support for the newly formed company.

We ask that the flame of the whaling industry will not be put out and that you do your best to secure Japan's food supplies. The government will be doing all it can to actively support your efforts.

Minister Shintaro Abe, 1976

Nihon Kyodo Hogei Co. Ltd. was later renamed Kyodo Senpaku Co. Ltd. and merged with the Japan Whaling Association and Institute of Cetacean Research to create the modern Institute of Cetacean Research in 1987.

=== Moratorium ===
In 1972, the United Nations Environmental Conference produced a 52–0 vote in favor of a 10-year global moratorium on commercial whaling. However, the UN resolution was not adopted by the IWC by a vote of 6-no, 4-yes and 4-abstain. Japan, the Soviet Union, Iceland, Norway, South Africa and Panama voted no.

In 1973, a moratorium was once again proposed and voted down in the IWC lacking the required 3/4 majority (8-yes, 5-no, 1-abstain). Japan, the Soviet Union, Iceland, Norway and South Africa voted no. Between 1973 and 1982 the IWC would see its membership increase from 14 nations to 37, perhaps stacking the vote in favor of anti-whaling nations. In 1980 and 1981 two more votes failed to establish a moratorium by a 3/4 majority (13–9–2 and 16–8–3).

In 1982, the IWC finally voted in favor of a moratorium on commercial whaling to go into force in 1986 (25–7–5). Japan objected to the moratorium and continued whaling (Under the ICRW an objecting nation is exempted from the disputed regulations. Japan also continued to hunt sperm whales despite a 1981 IWC zero catch quota.). The United States would play a significant role in Japan's acceptance of a global moratorium on commercial whaling due to its domestic laws. In particular the 1971 Pelly Amendment to the US Fishermen's Protection Act gives the US president legal authority to prohibit importation of fish products from any nation that is diminishing the effectiveness of fisheries conservation programs. It was later strengthened by the 1979 Packwood-Magnuson Amendment to the Fishery Conservation and Management Act giving the same sanctioning power with regard to the ICRW.

Potential US sanctions jeopardized access for Japanese fisheries to Alaskan waters, with an annual catch of a million tonnes of fish (1,100,000 short tons; 980,000 long tons), worth an estimated $425 million per year. A negotiated settlement was reached, allowing Japan to continue commercial whaling without the threat of US sanctions until 1988, with an agreement to drop Japan's objection to the moratorium in 1985. However, conservation groups sued the United States Secretary of Commerce, claiming that the law did not allow any deals. That claim was defeated by a US Supreme Court decision in 1986, and, as agreed, Japan withdrew its objection to the moratorium and ceased commercial whaling by 1988. Japan's access to Alaskan waters was later phased out anyway, due in part to pressure from US fishermen and conservationists, and also in response to Japan's subsequent use of research whaling.

=== Research whaling ===
In 1976, the quota for Southern Hemisphere Bryde's whales was set to zero by the IWC. However, Japan proceeded to take 225 of them during the 76–77 season by issuing itself a permit to take whales for scientific research under Article VIII of the ICRW. Following this event, the IWC recommended all future applications of Article VIII be reviewed by the IWC scientific committee.

In 1986, Japan introduced a similar proposal and later issued itself a scientific permit to take 825 minke whales and 50 sperm whales every year for ten years. Despite the fact that the IWC scientific committee rejected its research proposals, Japan continued whaling.

The IWC adopted a resolution in 1987 recommending Japan not proceed until disagreements over its research proposals were resolved. A second resolution was also adopted on February 14, 1988, recommending Japan not proceed. On February 9, 1988, Japanese whalers killed the first minke whale in Antarctic waters under the new self issued research whaling permit. US President Ronald Reagan responded by cutting off Japanese fishing privileges in US waters on April 6, 1988, under the Packwood-Magnuson Amendment.

Given the lack of any evidence that Japan is bringing its whaling activities into conformance with the recommendations of the IWC, I am directing the Secretary of State under the Packwood-Magnuson Amendment to withhold 100 percent of the fishing privileges that would otherwise be available to Japan in the U.S. Exclusive Economic Zone. Japan has requested the opportunity to fish for 3,000 metric tons of sea snails and 5,000 metric tons of Pacific whiting. These requests will be denied. In addition, Japan will be barred from any future allocations of fishing privileges for any other species, including Pacific cod, until the Secretary of Commerce determines that the situation has been corrected.

U.S. President Ronald Reagan, 1988

Japan has conducted research whaling programs in the North Pacific (JARPN 1994–1999, JARPN II 2000 – present) and in Antarctica (JARPA 1988–2005, JARPA II 2005 – present). The IWC has asked its members that conduct research whaling programs to demonstrate that the research provides critical information, that the research is needed for whale management purposes, and that non-lethal research techniques are not able to provide the same information. The IWC has issued at least 19 resolutions criticizing Japan for failing to meet these conditions and asking it to stop issuing permits.

The current JARPA II permit has been "for 850±10% Antarctic minke whales, 50 fin whales and 50 humpback whales annually. To date, Japan has refrained from taking humpback whales."

=== Normalization ===
In 1994, at its 46th annual meeting, the IWC established the Southern Ocean Whale Sanctuary in a 23–1–8 vote. Commercial whaling is prohibited within the sanctuary boundaries. Only Japan voted in opposition.

As the size of the IWC continued to grow, so did the influence of Japan within the commission. For example, many new Caribbean member nations voted in favor of whaling interests in 2000 including the defeat of a proposed South Pacific Whale Sanctuary. Additional support for whaling was gained in the Pacific, Africa and South-East Asia. As many of these nations received economic aid from Japan, accusations of vote buying were made by anti-whaling groups. In 2001, Japanese fisheries official Masayuki Komatsu stated Japan used overseas development aid as a tool to gain influence.

In 2006, the pro-whaling bloc won a symbolic victory in a non-binding resolution implying the moratorium on commercial whaling was both temporary and unnecessary (33–32–1).

Japan followed with a proposal to 'normalize' the IWC. In the proposal, Japan's representatives claimed the IWC had become dysfunctional in favor of the total elimination of whaling. It also suggested reforms such as the use of secret ballots and increased recognition of cultural differences in the IWC. A Conference for the Normalization of the International Whaling Commission was hosted by Japan in 2007.

After over 50 years of control, Japan's center-right conservative party, Liberal Democratic Party (LDP), lost in 2009 elections to the opposing left, Democratic Party of Japan (DPJ). Environmental organizations had wished the change in government would bring about an end to Japanese whaling. However, in 2009 the Foreign Minister of Japan, Katsuya Okada, explained that whaling would continue to receive support as a matter of policy.

A 2010 undercover investigation by reporters from the UK's Sunday Times revealed the officials of many developing countries accepted financial compensation from Japan for support in the IWC. Separate from millions in overseas development aid, membership fees, paid flights, hotel stays and spending money was all provided, by Japan, to gain the support of IWC delegates. In some cases cash was presented in envelopes by Japanese officials. Despite recordings from the investigation, officials implicated in the report have denied accepting bribes in exchange for votes.

Japan ended its 2010–2011 Antarctic hunt early, citing harassment by conservationists. However, it was later announced in October 2011 that the 2011–2012 whale hunt would go on as planned. An Associated Press poll of the Japanese public conducted in July and August 2011 found that 52% of Japanese supported whale hunting, 35% were neutral, and 13% were opposed.

In 2011, at the 63rd meeting of the IWC, Japan demonstrated the progress of its 'normalization' policy. When South American countries proposed a vote to establish a new whale sanctuary in the South Atlantic Ocean, Japanese delegates led Iceland, several Caribbean countries, and additional representatives in a walkout. As a result, the vote was postponed for one year along with other matters pending consideration by the commission.

=== 2010 IWC meeting ===
At the 2010 meeting of the International Whaling Commission in Morocco, representatives of the 88 member nations discussed whether or not to lift the 24-year ban on commercial whaling. Japan, Norway and Iceland urged the organization to lift the ban. A coalition of anti-whaling nations offered a compromise plan that would allow these countries to continue whaling, but with smaller catches and under close supervision. Their plan would also completely ban whaling in the Southern Ocean. More than 200 scientists and experts opposed the compromise proposal for lifting the ban, and also opposed allowing whaling in the Southern Ocean, which was declared a whale sanctuary in 1994 (Southern Ocean Whale Sanctuary).

=== Post-ICJ ruling ===
Following the temporary cessation of its activities in the Southern Ocean during 2014, Japan announced a research plan for the "New Scientific Whale Research Program in the Antarctic Ocean" in late November 2014, as a replacement of previous programs. In March 2014, the ICJ ruled that the new program's predecessor was "not for the purposes of scientific research". The replacement "NEWREP-A" plan, scheduled to commence in December 2015, covered a larger area of the Southern Ocean around the Antarctic, and 3,996 whales were to be targeted over 12 years, which is fewer than in previous seasons.

The plan was submitted to the IWC and its scientific commission, but approval was not required from either for Japan to proceed. The ICJ ruling did not prevent Japan from undertaking further whale research activities in the Antarctic region, but, in accordance with the ICJ's decision, NEWREP-A needed to sufficiently meet two objectives:

1. Improvement of both biological and ecological data on Antarctic minke whales.
2. Investigation of the structure and dynamics of the Antarctic marine ecosystem through the development of ecosystem models.

Japan stipulated that it will only kill whales if non-lethal methods of data collection and biopsy sampling fail to meet the plan's objectives. Furthermore, the International Union for Conservation of Nature and Natural Resources (IUCN) has declared that information on the number of Antarctic minke whale "data deficient". In early October 2015, Japan's ambassador to the UN, Motohide Yoshikawa, announced that Japan does not accept the court's jurisdiction over research, conservation, or exploitation of marine life and would proceed with NEWREP-A, without waiting for the court's approval. On December 1, 2015, Japan sent a fleet to the Antarctic Ocean with the aim of hunting 330 minke whales. The fleet included the ship the Nisshin Maru and three smaller boats. The move was met with objections from the Australian and New Zealand governments.

=== 2018 Florianopolis Declaration ===
On September 13, 2018, IWC members gathered in Florianópolis, Brazil, where they discussed and rejected a proposal by Japan to renew commercial whaling. Through the "Florianopolis Declaration", it was concluded that the purpose of the IWC is the conservation of whales and that they would now safeguard the marine mammals in perpetuity and would allow the recovery of all whale populations to pre-industrial whaling levels. The non-binding agreement was backed by 40 countries, with 27 pro-whaling states voting against. Under this resolution, limited hunts by some indigenous communities are still permitted.

On December 26, 2018, Japan announced that since the IWC failed its duty to promote sustainable hunting, which is one of its stated goals, Japan is withdrawing its membership and will resume commercial hunting in its territorial waters and exclusive economic zone from July 1, 2019, but will cease whaling activities in the Antarctic Ocean. While the Japanese Ministry of Foreign Affairs was cautious against leaving the IWC, the move was spearheaded by Toshihiro Nikai, a member of the Japanese National Diet and then-current secretary general of the Liberal Democratic Party. Nikai's electorate includes the town of Taiji, Wakayama. On July 1, 2019, two minke whales, the first catch after the resumption of commercial whaling were unloaded at Kushiro port in Hokkaido.

== Production ==
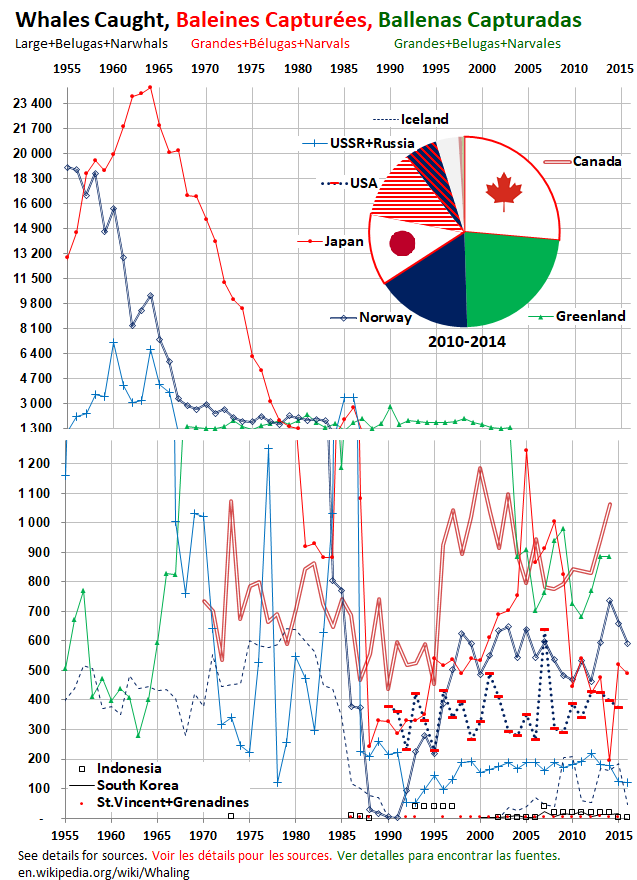
Whales caught, by country and year, 1955-2016

Until 2018, Japanese whaling was conducted in both pelagic (open-ocean) areas in the North Pacific Ocean and the Southern Ocean near Antarctica. Coastal waters are also utilized for small-type coastal whaling of dolphins and other small cetaceans. Large and small whales are sometimes taken as bycatch in the nets of Japanese fishing vessels as well.

=== Pelagic whaling ===
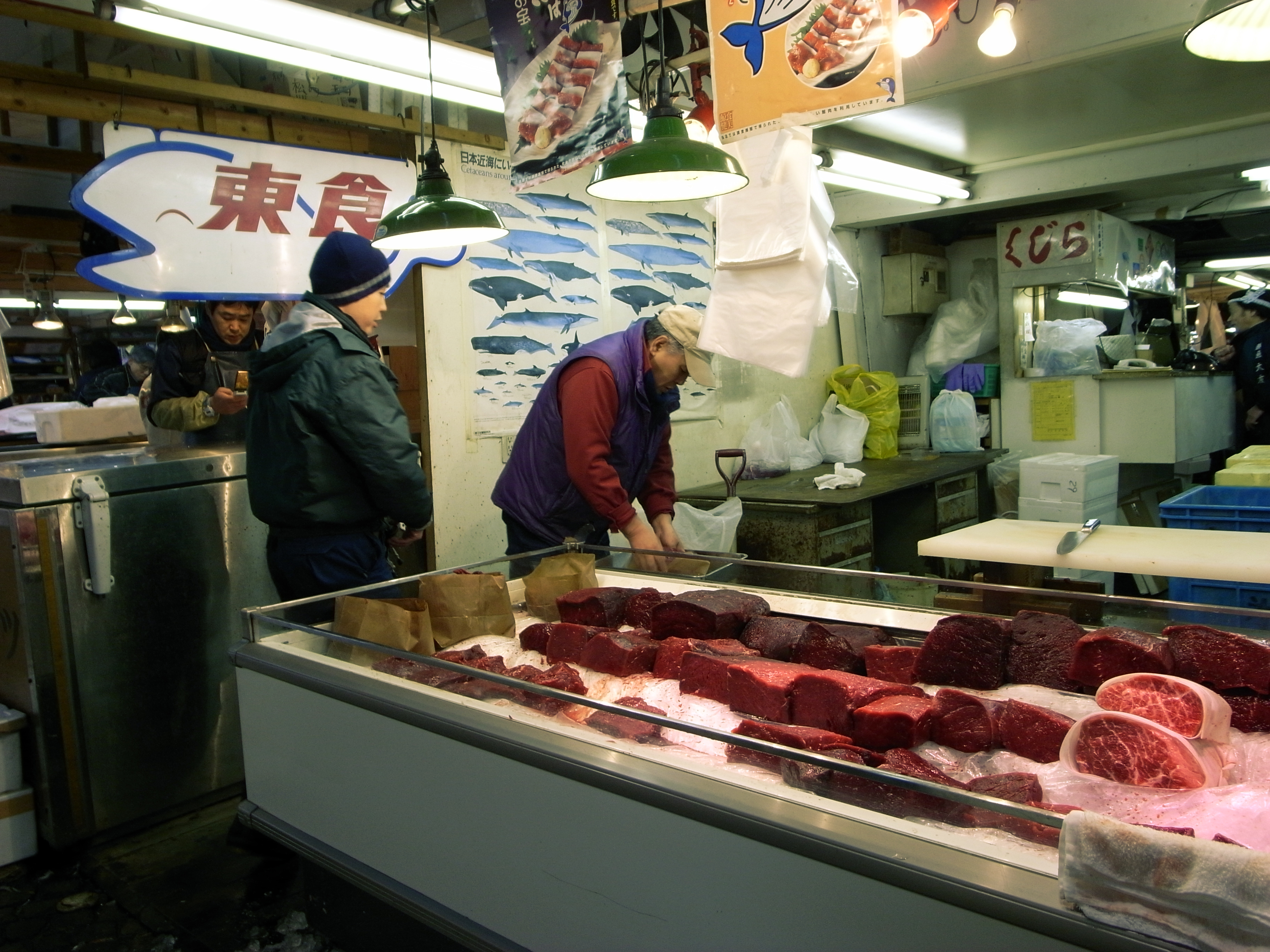
Whale meat on sale at Tsukiji fish market in Tokyo, Japan

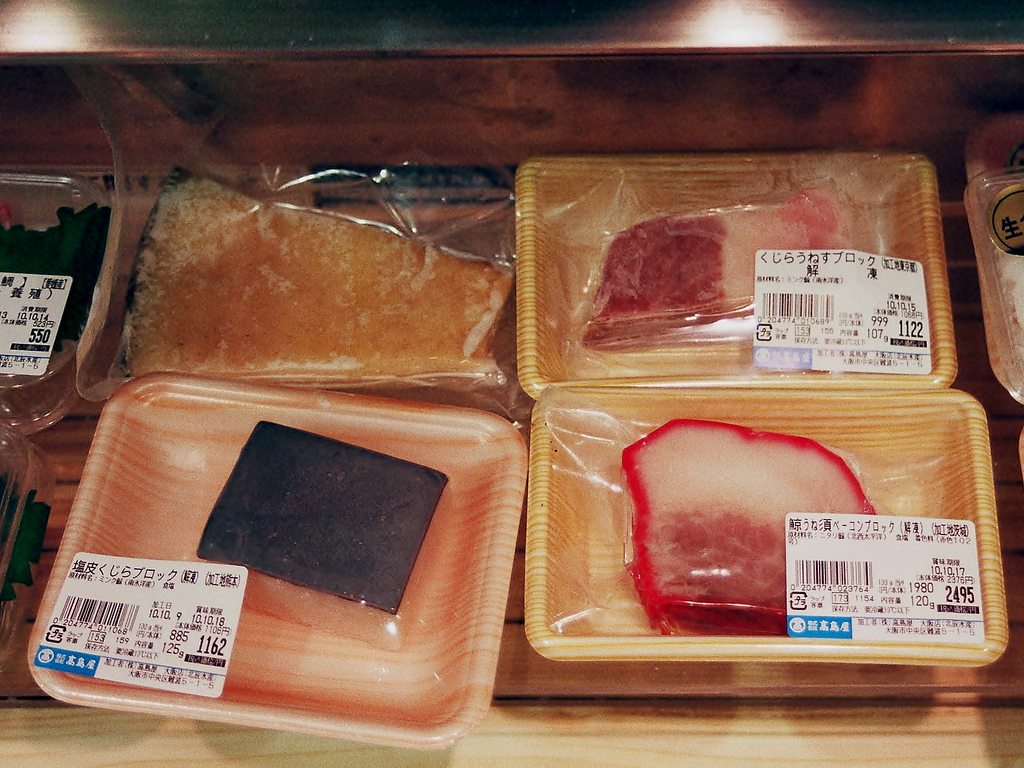
Various cuts of whale meat for sale

Japan's pelagic whaling fleet, which annually hunts large whales in the Southern Ocean, consists of a number of ships for hunting and processing whale catch as well as securing the hunt against protests. During the 2009–10 season, the Japanese fleet included a factory ship, four whale catchers and two security patrol vessels. The Japanese self-imposed quota includes 935 minke, 50 fin and 50 humpback whales per season.

When whales are spotted the whale catchers will engage in pursuit. A harpoon cannon with a grenade tipped harpoon is fired at the target whale. A rope is trailed from the harpoon in order to prevent the whale from being lost. If the whale is struck and not killed instantly by the explosive tipped harpoon, a second harpoon may be used or the whale may be shot with a rifle until dead. A past method of using a second harpoon to electrocute whales is now forbidden by the IWC. Environmental groups have reported whales being dragged backward and drowned.

Each caught whale is secured to the side of a whale catcher with rope. Lines are later used to transfer the whales from the whale catcher to the factory ship. Whales are next winched onto the factory ship through a slipway at the stern of the vessel. On the flensing deck several workers use specialized tools to butcher the whale. Usable product is delivered to the lower decks of the ship for further processing and refrigerated storage. Non usable product is dumped back into the ocean.

Additional regulations from the United Nations International Maritime Organization took effect on August 1, 2011, prohibiting ships using heavy oil from navigation in the Antarctic Treaty System area to prevent pollution. The IMO Guidelines For Ships Operating In Ice-Covered Waters also establishes requirements for a double-hull strengthened against ice-related damage. The Japanese factory ship Nisshin Maru does not currently meet these IMO standards.

=== Small-type coastal whaling ===
Coastal fishing fleets that hunt dolphins use many small boats in a coordinated effort. The fishermen bang metal poles in the water in order to frighten and therefore guide noise-sensitive dolphins toward the shore. A series of nets are then used to corral the dolphins in. Divers and fishermen in boats next lance or cut the throats of the dolphins and haul them away to a nearby shore station for processing. A few dolphins are selected for sale to aquariums and spared for the marine aquarium (dolphinarium) entertainment industry.

The practice of dolphin drive hunting in Taiji, Japan was the subject of a 2009 documentary film entitled The Cove.

Japanese whalers have hunted Baird's beaked whales on the Bōsō Peninsula, Wada, since the 17th century. Once landed just off the coast of Japan, the beaked whales are pulled onto a landing station with ropes and then butchered for sale. The meat is sold as food and the rest is sold to be used as organic fertilizer.

In May 2007 the IWC rejected a proposal to expand coastal catches. The quota was limited to a total of 66 whales between four whaling towns. The whalers of Wada encourage local children to attend the first butchering of each season followed by a community event where whale meat is served.

According to the Japan Fisheries Agency up to 20,000 dolphins of several species will be taken, in many locations along the coast of Japan, over the course of a six-month season. Coastal whaling communities suffered significant damage as a result of the earthquake and tsunami disaster in March 2011.

=== Bycatch ===
In 2009, published DNA analysis of whale meat from Japanese markets suggested as many as 150 large whales from vulnerable coastal stocks were taken annually as bycatch. Japan legally allows the commercial sale of whales caught incidentally, entangled in fishing nets designed to catch coastal fish. Market surveys also detected migratory whales such as the endangered Humpback and endangered Gray whales, as well as the threatened Finback whale, and the non-endangered Bryde's whales.

The impact on J-stock whales, which have protected status under the IWC, seemingly increased with changes in Japanese regulations that legalized the sale of bycatch in 2001. Between 1997 and 2000 only 19–29 whales were annually reported caught as bycatch. The number increased to 89 – 137 annually between 2001 and 2004. However, the study concluded from genetic information that the actual amount of bycatch was similarly high prior to the 2001 regulations but was under-reported. Up to 46% of the samples tested proved to be J-stock.

Prior to the 2001 change in regulations, fishermen could not legally sell minke whales to commercial firms and were supposed to sell them locally or destroy them and report the incident. The high percentage of J-stock bycatch presents a significant threat including the possibility of extinction within a few decades according to IWC population estimates.

=== Whaling in coastal Japan ===
In Japan, several whale species have been targets of illegal captures, including humpback, minke, sperm whales, western gray, the endangered North Pacific right, and northern fin whale while utilizing harpoons for dolphin hunts or intentionally drive whales into nets. Reports are later filed with administrative organs or research institutions as cases of entanglements where fishermen tried their best to save whales. As of 2005, products from internationally protected species' meat can also be found on markets mostly originating as "by-products" of entanglements, and there has been a case in which it was revealed that at least some humpbacks with other species were illegally hunted in EEZs of anti-whaling nations such as off the coast of Mexico or South Africa, and the whalers tried to transport the catch to Japan by hiring vessels from other countries and even trying to go on overland routes within other nations.

=== Imports ===
In 2009, Japan accepted imports of whale meat from Norway and Iceland for the first time in over a decade. The Norwegian shipment arrived in mid-2008 but was held by Japanese customs until January 2009 when the Japan Fisheries Agency finally approved the import.

The international trade of whale meat is prohibited by CITES (Convention on International Trade in Endangered Species). However, Japan, Norway and Iceland registered reservations with the treaty in order to remain exempt. The Norwegian company, Myklebust Trading, exports common minke whale and Iceland's Hvalur hf exports Fin whale, which is a vulnerable species. Environmental organizations criticized the trade and expressed doubts that Japanese markets could absorb the increase in supply as thousands of tonnes of whale meat remained in cold storage in Japan. In 2010, Iceland's proposed quota in killing fin whales was much larger than the amount of whale meat the Japanese market could absorb. In negotiations with Marc Wall, Economic Minister-Counselor at the US embassy in Tokyo, Jun Yamashita of the Japanese Fisheries Agencies, however, rejected a 2010 proposal to suggest to Iceland to reduce the number of killed fin whales to a more reasonable number.

=== Disputes among the public in Japan ===
The first whale watching in Japan was conducted in the Bonin Islands in 1998 by a group called Geisharen (鯨者連), which was formed by groups of domestic and international people including both domestic and international celebrities and notable cetacean researchers and conservationists such as Roger Payne, Erich Hoyt, Richard Oliver, Jim Darling, John Ford, Kyusoku Iwamoto (cartoonist), Hutoushiki Ueki (science writer), Nobuyuki Miyazaki (head chief of the Atmosphere and Ocean Research Institute of The University of Tokyo), Nobuaki Mochizuki (one of the world's first whale photographers to record a living North Pacific right whale underwater in 1990 in Bonin Islands), Junko Sakuma (freelancer), and so on. During the time leading up until the group reaching the destination, the Ministry of Agriculture, Forestry and Fisheries (Japan) as well as anonymous groups and individuals watched the group's movements and threatened them not to conduct the tour. Prior to this movement, those who claimed conserving marine mammals including pinnipeds, or individuals who tried to correct illegal and over-extensive hunts (including C. W. Nicol who was a sympathizer to Japan's whaling industries) or domestic medias that have done reporting assignments in Japan had been discriminated. Some of these including former fishermen who were ostracized in their communities later became whale-watching operators. Several other tours have been operated by former whalers or dolphin hunters such as at Abashiri, Muroto, and so on.

== Scientific research ==
Scientific whaling is accepted under the Article VIII of the convention of IWC. The Article VIII claims that each member nation can grant its nationals a permit to take or kill whales for scientific purposes. Dissimilar from the international regulations on commercial and aboriginal whaling, the scientific researches and the number of whales killed for scientific purposes are unilateral. Although the Scientific Committee (SC) of the IWC attempted to provide expert assessment of national research plans, the nations carrying out scientific whaling, especially Japan, still use scientific whaling as an alibi for their excess in whaling.

After halting its commercial whaling in 1986, Japan began scientific research hunts to provide a basis for the resumption of sustainable whaling. According to environmental groups and the Australian Environment Minister, the ostensible research serves to disguise commercial whaling in circumvention of the IWC moratorium. The IWC Scientific Committee collects up-to-date data on catch limits and catches taken since 1985. Numbers have ranged from less than 200 in 1985 to close to 1,000 in 2007.

The research is conducted by the Institute of Cetacean Research (ICR), a privately owned, non-profit institution. The institute receives its funding from government subsidies and Kyodo Senpaku, which handles processing and marketing of the whale meat. Japan carried out its "scientific" whaling in two areas: the North-West Pacific Ocean (JARPN II) and the Antarctic Ocean (JARPA) Southern Hemisphere catch. The 2007/08 JARPA mission had a self-imposed quota of 900 minke whales and 50 fin whales.

On March 31, 2014, the International Court of Justice (ICJ) stated its decision (by 12–4 votes) that Japan's whaling program was not for scientific purposes. The Court ordered that "Japan revoke any extant authorization, permit or licence to kill, take or treat whales" and refrain from granting any further permits.

=== Catches ===
Japanese whale catches 1985–2017, by species and region

IWC – Japan: Catches Under Objection (1985–1988)
| Area | Fin | Sperm | Sei | Brydes | Minke | Total |
|---|---|---|---|---|---|---|
| N. Pacific | 0 | 388 | 0 | 634 | 615 | 1,637 |
| S. Hemisphere | 0 | 0 | 0 | 0 | 3,882 | 3,882 |
| Total | 0 | 388 | 0 | 634 | 4,497 | 5,519 |

IWC – Japan: Special Permit Catches (1988–2017) (Note: Data is current through the end of 2016–2017 season; last updated November 13, 2018.)
| Area | Fin | Sperm | Sei | Brydes | Minke | Total |
|---|---|---|---|---|---|---|
| N. Pacific | 0 | 56 | 1,359 | 734 | 2,776 | 4,925 |
| S. Hemisphere | 18 | 0 | 0 | 0 | 11,380 | 11,398 |
| Total | 18 | 56 | 1,359 | 734 | 14,156 | 16,323 |

=== JARPA ===
The JARPA research program took place near Antarctica from 1988 to 2005. Its stated objectives were to determine mortality rates, whale stock numbers and structure, the role of whales in the Antarctic ecosystem and how environmental changes affect whales. The whaling operation alternated between several pre-established areas intending to take 400 or more minke whales per season.

In 1997 the IWC scientific committee officially reviewed the JARPA program. The committee expected reasonable precision and usefulness of the data collected but disagreed on whether lethal methods were necessary. It was also noted that the results could potentially allow for an increase in the number of minke whales annually taken.

In the final 2007 review, the committee agreed with the initial 1997 mid assessment. It recognized that progress had been made in identifying stock structure and at least two stocks were found in the research area. Agreed estimates of abundance could not be developed and preliminary estimates may only reflect major changes in abundance over a long time line. Problems were identified with age and mortality rate data. Krill-related work was welcomed but relatively little progress was made toward understanding the role of whales in the Antarctic ecosystem. Data on pollution was also welcomed but disagreement continued over the interpretation of the results. Levels of toxic pollutants were lower in Antarctic whales than those sampled in the Northern hemisphere.

The commission made note of the fact that the catches took place in the IWC established Southern Ocean Whale Sanctuary and that improving management of whaling in a sanctuary is unnecessary. The 2007-1 resolution on JARPA was one of several calling on Japan by majority vote to suspend its lethal research.

=== JARPA II ===
Like its predecessor, the JARPA II research whaling program took place near Antarctica. Starting in 2005 until 2018, the stated objectives included monitoring the Antarctic ecosystem, modeling competition between whale species, recording changes in stock structure and improving future management of Antarctic whales. The program calls for 950 minke whales, 50 fin whales and 50 humpback whales annually.

Disagreement over the value of the research, the use of lethal methods and the sample sizes continued in both the scientific committee and the commission. In 2005 and 2007 the commission passed resolutions by majority urging Japan to stop all lethal research in JARPA II.

On March 31, 2014, the International Court of Justice (ICJ) ruled that JARPA II was not for scientific purposes and forbade the granting of further permits. Following the ruling, Japan cancelled its Antarctic whaling hunt for the first time in more than 25 years, though it announced plans to propose a new research program designed to meet the standards set by the ICJ the following year.

=== JARPN ===
From 1994 to 1999 Japan carried out its research program JARPN in the western North Pacific. Its stated goals were to improve knowledge of stock identity, improve implementation simulation trials for North Pacific common minke whales and act as a feasibility study for a program on feeding ecology. The program called for 100 minke whales annually. The results were reviewed by the committee in February 2000. The committee agreed that the information was useful for management but no consensus was reached on whether lethal methods of research were necessary.

As with JARPA, the IWC issued resolutions calling for Japan to cease issuing permits for the take of minke whales citing concerns over the need for lethal methods such as the 1999-3 Resolution on whaling under Special Permit.

=== JARPN II ===
JARPN II began with a feasibility study from 2000 to 2001 to continue taking whales in the western North Pacific Ocean including 100 common minke whales, 50 Bryde's whales and 10 sperm whales. The objectives of the program included study of feeding ecology (such as prey consumption), stock structure and the environmental impacts of cetaceans. In 2002 after the completion of the initial study, Japan proposed and began a long-term program to study how feeding ecology relates to sustainable use in the Pacific and within Japan's exclusive economic zone. In 2008 the program included a proposal for an annual take of 340 minke whales, 50 Bryde's whales, 100 sei and 10 sperm whales.

Disagreement over the objectives, methodology, effect on stocks and overall success of the program continued in the scientific committee review of the feasibility study and full program. The full program introduced a change from previous use of the ICRW Article VIII research provision by not specifying an end date. The objectives were deemed unnecessary for stock management by some members, and that it would not contribute significantly to previously identified research needs. The sample size and methods proposed were unlikely to satisfy the program objectives, and the ecosystem modeling was considered to be poorly developed.

Some contended the program placed undue emphasis on assumed negative effects of cetacean predation on fishery resources while failing to address the effects of fisheries on cetaceans. However, others believed determining the effects of cetaceans on fish stocks and more information on minke stock structure to be critically important. Some stated the feasibility study would provide valuable information on methodology and other aspects of the program would improve over time and contribute to fundamental questions. The committee identified that the pollution objective did not contribute to the goals of the IWC Pollution 2000+ project but remained relevant to the IWC for long-term study.

Disagreement over the value of data obtained through lethal methods continued as well. Some argued that a wide range of questions could be answered through non-lethal means such as "for pollutant monitoring (biopsy sampling for fatty acid and stable isotope analysis), for stock structure (photo identification, biopsy sampling and faecal sampling), and for feeding ecology (faecal sampling)." Others argued that prey data was required for modeling purposes that could not be acquired through non-lethal means. However, feeding ecology was not necessarily relevant to stock management according to some who argued biopsy sampling would allow for a greater amount of statistical data.

Argument continued over the potential negative effects of catches, such as depletion of O-stock and J-stock whales, when the only data on many of the populations came from selective extrapolations of JSV (survey) data. Proponents contended that the JSV data was reliable and the research area extended from coastal areas to offshore areas thus limiting pressure on coastal stocks.

In 2000, 2001 and 2003 more resolutions were passed by the IWC urging Japan to cease issuing special permits for whaling and limit research to non-lethal methods. Another Scientific Committee review was conducted in January 2009.

=== Publications ===
Over 120 publications have resulted from the lethal and non-lethal research conducted during the JARPA programs. Many of these articles are published in international peer-reviewed scientific journals, and some have both Japanese and non-Japanese scientists as co-authors. However, after killing 3,600 minke whales, the program produced just two peer-reviewed scientific papers since 2005. The presiding judge of the International Court of Justice ruled on March 31, 2014, that "In light of the fact the Jarpa II has been going on since 2005, and has involved the killing of about 3,600 minke whales, the scientific output to date appears limited, Japan shall revoke any existent authorisation, permit or licence granted in relation to Jarpa II and refrain from granting any further permits in pursuance to the program."

In 2008, a study based on data gathered by JARPA research was published in a peer-reviewed Western academic journal, Polar Biology. The study, for which 4704 whales were killed, implied that Antarctic minke whales lost 9% of their blubber over 18 years due to a lack of ocean resources such as krill. Lars Walløe, a Norwegian of the University of Oslo, assisted with analyzing the data and claimed the study was first rejected by two other journals for political reasons. Nick Gales, of the Australian Antarctic Division, stated the study failed to address criticisms of its methodology when initially presented. The study contradicted previous JARPA studies indicating Antarctic minke whale populations were healthy.

== Resumption of commercial whaling ==
Following the September 2018 Florianopolis Declaration where the IWC rejected Japan's latest commercial hunt proposal, and concluded that the purpose of the IWC is the conservation of whales, Japan withdrew its IWC membership on December 26, 2018. It then resumed commercial hunting in its territorial waters and exclusive economic zone on July 1, 2019, but ceased whaling activities in the Antarctic Ocean.

Japan expects to hunt 227 minke whales by the end of 2019, but without government subsidies, their whaling industry is not expected to survive. A subsidy of 5.1 billion yen (US$47.31 million) was budgeted for commercial whaling in 2019.

== Controversy ==
Anti-whaling governments and groups have strongly opposed Japan's whaling program. Greenpeace argues that whales are endangered and must be protected. The Japanese government claims that it strongly supports the protection of endangered species, and the scientific whaling is essential to gather information about the status of the various populations. It further claims that the scale of the research is such that it does not affect the stock of the species. The 1985 IWC estimate put the Southern Hemisphere minke whale population at 761,000 (510,000–1,140,000 in the 95% confidence estimate). A paper submitted to the IWC on population estimates in Antarctic waters using CNB gives a population of 665,074 based on Southern Ocean Whale and Ecosystem Research Programme (SOWER) data.

Research methodology has come under scrutiny as it has been argued that non-lethal methods of research are available and that Japan's research whaling is commercial whaling in disguise. The Japanese claim that the accuracy of tissue and feces samples is insufficient and lethal sampling is necessary.

In 2002, the World Wildlife Fund published an open letter to the Japanese (in both Japanese and English text) in the New York Times signed by a group of international scientists, stating their assertion that "Japan's whale 'research' program fails to meet minimum standards for credible science". They accused Japan of "using the pretense of scientific research to evade its commitments to the world community." Signatories to the letter included Sylvia Earle (former Chief Scientist of the NOAA), Giuseppe Notarbartolo di Sciara (former President of the European Cetacean Society) and Roger Payne (founder of the Ocean Alliance).

In Volume 53, No. 3 of the journal BioScience, twenty members of the Scientific Committee of the International Whaling Commission confirmed "that the signers of the open letter correctly summarized criticisms made by researchers very familiar with Japanese scientific whaling", and that "so little of any significance to IWC management can be obtained only from whaling catches that it is impossible to justify killing animals on this basis."

A 2006 episode of the Australian Broadcasting Corporation's popular science show Catalyst, which strongly argued against whaling, reported that of the 18 year JARPA I program, which lethally obtained samples from 6800 whales, less than 55 peer-reviewed papers were produced, of which only 14 were claimed on the program to be relevant to the goals of the JARPA program, and that only four would require lethal sampling. Some of the research includes a paper named Fertilizability of ovine, bovine, and minke whales spermatozoa intracytoplasmically injected into bovine oocytes. Joji Morishita of JARPA has said the number of samples was required in order to obtain statistically significant data.

Sea Shepherd Conservation Society contends that Japan, as well as Iceland and Norway, is in violation of the IWC moratorium on all commercial whaling.

Anti-whaling campaigners claim that the Japanese public does not support the government for its whaling policy. However, all the major political parties from the right wing LDP to the Japanese Communist Party do support whaling. The meat ends up at Tokyo's famed Tsukiji fish market and other high-end restaurants. People previously involved in the industry have reported rampant meat embezzlement.

Japanese fisheries companies have expanded abroad and experienced pressure from partners and environmental groups. Five large fishing companies transferred their whaling fleet shares to public interest corporations in 2006. In 2007, Kyokuyo and Maruha, two of Japan's four largest fishing companies, decided to end their sales of whale meat due to pressure from partners and environmental groups in the US.

The International Court of Justice ruled in March 2014 that Japan can no longer conduct its JARPA II program, rejecting the country's argument that it was for scientific purposes. All findings in the judgement refer specifically to the JARPA II program in the Antarctic, so the JARPN program in the NW Pacific is not affected.

In November 2014, Japan announced that it would resume hunting whales in the Southern Ocean, but that it would reduce its catch target by two-thirds. Japan's Fisheries Agency said that Japan intends to catch 333 minke whales each year between 2015 and 2027, down from 935 minke and 50 fin whales. It said the hunts were needed for collecting scientific data and were exempt from a 1986 international ban on commercial whaling, despite the ICJ ruling.

=== Cultural aspects ===
Japanese have a long history of whaling. Some towns can show their whaling history for hundreds of years. This history plays an important role to answer the question why the Japanese have kept hunting whales in recent years. Attempts to stop the nation's whaling are perceived as a threat to Japanese culture because eating whale meat is an aspect of Japanese tradition. "No one has the right to criticize the food culture of another people," said Matayuki Komatsu of Japan's Fisheries Agency.

Proponents of Japanese whaling (including the government of Japan) often argue that it is a cultural practice which foreigners should not oppose on the basis of cultural differences. Joji Morishita of Japanese Fisheries Agency in 2001 noted that the Japanese public also feels that anti-whaling groups are covertly racist. With Norway and Iceland hunting whales on a commercial basis, according to Morishita, "Singling out [Japan's] whaling is cultural imperialism – some people would say it's racism. Norway and Iceland are also whalers, but the criticism of Japan is stronger." However, critics have forcibly attacked the "cultural defense", with for example Sea Shepherd Conservation Society representatives comparing it to forced female genital cutting in Sudan, saying that although it is a practice that may have cultural roots, it still should be opposed out of necessity. A professor of environmental studies in Japan wrote in his book that Japan's modern commercial whaling bears little resemblance to the small-scale subsistence whaling that, until the dawn of the 20th century, was limited to certain coastal regions, and Japan's whale-eating culture was also very limited in scope and an invented tradition, only lasting 20 years from the end of World War II to the early 1960s to augment Japanese school lunch programs during the U.S. occupation.

=== Debate in the IWC ===
The most vocal opponents of the Japanese push for a resumption of commercial whaling are Australia, New Zealand and the United Kingdom. The Australian government's stated purpose for opposing whaling is the need for conservation of endangered species. The New Zealand government is opposed to hunting whales for food or research and the UK government asserts "that whaling does not serve any genuine need and involves unacceptable cruelty."

In July 2004, it was reported that a working group of Japan's ruling Liberal Democratic had drawn up plans to leave the IWC in order to join a new pro-whaling organization, NAMMCO, because of the IWC's refusal to back the principle of sustainable commercial whaling. Japan is particularly opposed to the IWC Conservation Committee, introduced in 2003, which it says exists solely to prevent any whaling. Any directives from the IWC are undertaken on a purely voluntary basis as state sovereignty means that there are few avenues by which international law can be enforced.

At an International Whaling Commission (IWC) meeting in 2006, a resolution calling for the eventual return of commercial whaling was passed by a majority of just one vote. There has been a failure to lift the ban on commercial whale hunting and Japan has since threatened to leave the IWC until the whaling moratorium has ended.

In 2007 the IWC passed a resolution asking Japan to refrain from issuing a permit for lethal research in the Southern Ocean Whale Sanctuary – the main Japanese whaling area. After a visit to Tokyo by the chairman of the IWC, asking the Japanese for their co-operation in sorting out the differences between pro- and anti-whaling nations on the commission, the Japanese whaling fleet agreed that no humpback whales would be caught for the two years it would take for the IWC to reach a formal agreement.

On March 31, 2014, the ICJ ruled that "Japan must revoke any extant authorization, permit or licence to kill, take or treat whales" in the Southern Ocean Whale Sanctuary and refrain from granting any further permits. Following that ruling, Japan proposed to launch a "reviewed" research hunt. In response, the IWC voted and concluded on September 18, 2014, that "Japan should abide by an International Court of Justice ruling", but Japanese officials vowed to continue whale hunting in the Antarctic in 2015.

=== Australian opposition ===
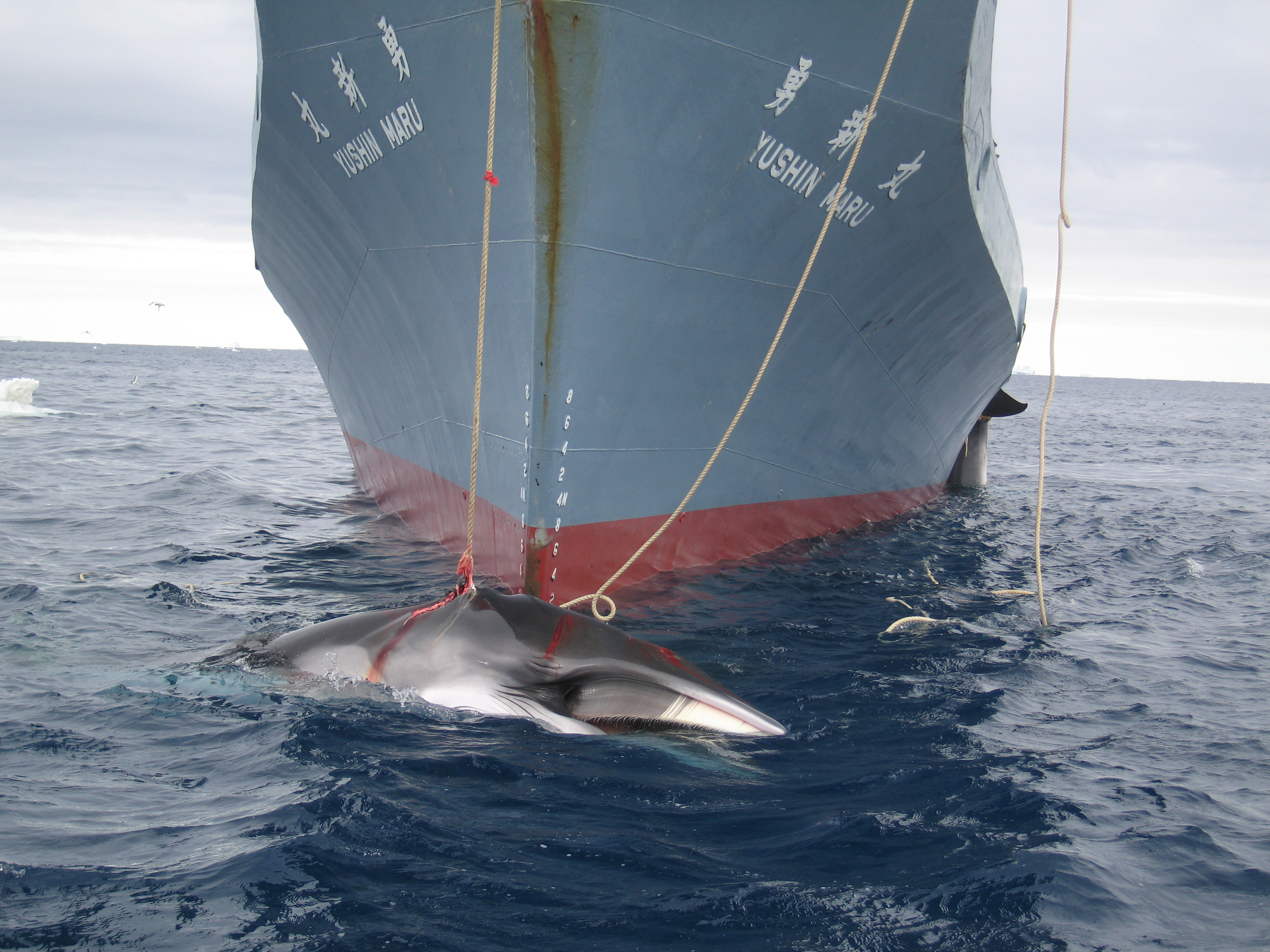
One of the photos released by Australia in 2008, this one of the Yūshin Maru with a harpooned minke whale

Due to the proximity to Antarctica, the government of Australia has been particularly vocal in its opposition to Japan's whaling activity in the Southern Pacific. In 1994, Australia claimed a 200-nautical-mile (370 km) exclusive economic zone (EEZ) around the Australian Antarctic Territory, which also includes a southerly portion of the IWC Southern Ocean Whale Sanctuary. In December 2007, the Rudd government announced plans to monitor Japanese whalers about to enter Australian waters in order to gather evidence for a possible international legal challenge and on January 8, 2008, the Australian government sent the Australian customs vessel Oceanic Viking on a 20-day surveillance mission to track and monitor the fleet. On February 7, 2008, the Australian government released photographs of the ICR harpoon ship Yūshin Maru killing several different whales, and a mother whale and her 1-year-old calf being taken on board the Nisshin Maru for processing (see photos at right and top of page). The Australian government also used that opportunity to reject ICR's scientific research claims by calling them "without foundation", and declaring that "You do not have to kill a whale in the Southern Ocean to gain a deeper understanding of it."

In late 2009, the Prime Minister of Australia restated official objections to Japan's whaling programs and threatened to take legal action through international courts.

We, if we cannot resolve this matter diplomatically, will take international legal action. I'm serious about it, I would prefer to deal with it diplomatically, but if we cannot get there, that's the alternative course of action.

Australian PM Kevin Rudd, 2009

==== ICJ case ====
On May 31, 2010, the Australian Government lodged formal proceedings against Japan in the International Court of Justice (ICJ) in The Hague, Netherlands. In a joint ministerial statement, the government stated that it "has not taken this decision lightly".

On January 5, 2011, leaked US diplomatic cables revealed that the Australian legal challenge to Japanese whaling was heavily influenced by domestic political pressures and Australian government advisers were left deeply pessimistic about the prospects of success in the International Court. In its reports to Washington, the US Embassy reported that Australian government contacts were stating that the legal proceedings "would be unlikely to stop the whale hunt entirely, but could well force modifications that would make it more difficult for the Japanese". The Australian public overwhelmingly supports governmental efforts to stop Japanese whaling, even at risk of losing valuable trade relations. The New Zealand government lodged a "Declaration of Intervention" with the ICJ on February 6, 2013, in which it deemed Japan as ineligible for a Special Permit that would allow whaling on the basis of scientific research.

As a result of the Australian government's 2010 application, a court case was heard at the ICJ. The hearing ran from June 26, 2013, until July 6, 2013. In its deposition to the ICJ, the Australian government has claimed that Japan "has breached and is continuing to breach" its obligations under the international convention, and further asserted that Japan has refused to accept IWC recommendations. Solicitor-General of Australia Justin Gleeson appeared for Australia before the ICJ.

The ICJ's 16-judge bench received and then decided upon the case. Rothwell stated that the case "is a complex one which raises novel legal issues not previously considered by any international court".

Tony Press, CEO of the Antarctic Climate and Ecosystems Cooperative Research Centre at the University of Tasmania, Australia, provided weekly reports of the ICJ hearings for The Conversation Australia media publication. Following the second week, Press relayed that Japan articulated in certain terms its intentions in the Southern Ocean: "the proper conservation of whale stocks and thus make possible the orderly development of the whaling industry", further explaining that a whale must be killed to obtain certain types of information, such as the collection of ear plugs to estimate the age of a whale. During the second week, Professor Lars Walløe, of the University of Oslo and a former Norwegian Commissioner to the Whaling Commission was presented by Japan as its sole expert witness.

During the week beginning July 8, 2013, New Zealand delivered its intervention, in which it provided a history of the origin of the 1946 Whaling Convention and Australian Attorney-General Mark Dreyfus affirmed that his nation had not "colluded" with New Zealand to launch the ICJ proceedings. Dreyfus concluded Australia's contribution by emphasizing the friendship shared by Australia and Japan, and stated: "Australia respectfully requests the Court to bring Japan's whaling program to an end."

The ICJ hearing concluded on July 16, 2013. In Japan's final presentation Professor Payam Akhavan of McGill University stated: ""it would not be an exaggeration to say that Australia's case now hangs by a thread".

On March 31, 2014, the ICJ ruled that Japan's whaling program was not for scientific purposes. The Court ordered that "Japan revoke any extant authorization, permit or licence to kill, take or treat whales" and refrain from granting any further permits. The court's judges agreed with Australia that the number of Japanese scientific research publications were not proportionate to the number of animals killed. Two former Australian Environment ministers applauded the decision and stated their hopes that Japan would respect it. The decision of the ICJ is final and the right of appeal does not apply in this context.

Japanese officials confirmed their nation's recognition of the ICJ decision in March 2014, whereby the ruling would be upheld. A media report, published in September 2014, reported on the intention of Japanese officials to submit a revised programme to the IWC's scientific committee in November 2014.

=== Opposition by environmental groups ===
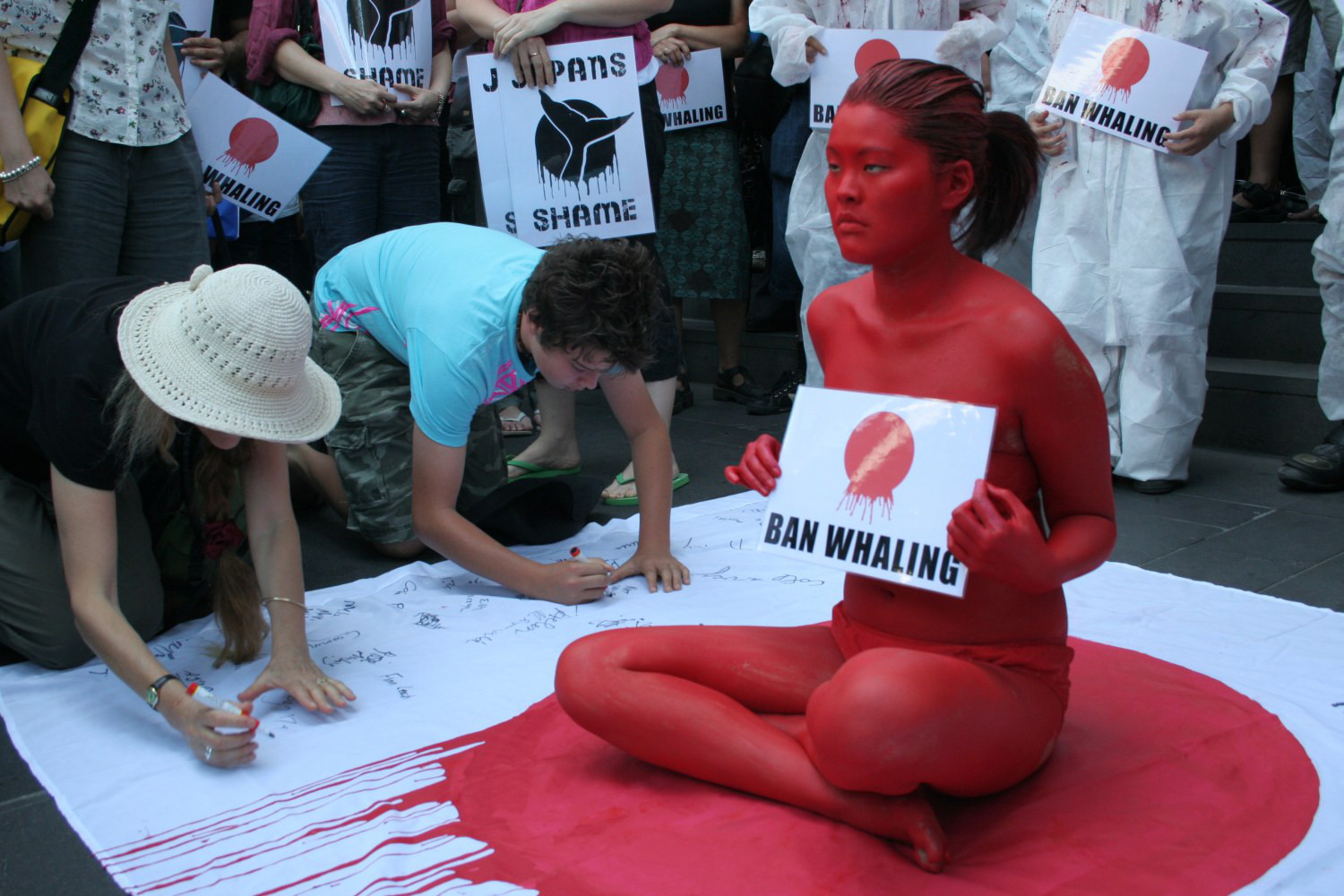
Anti-whaling protester in Melbourne, Australia, 2007

The Japanese whaling fleet had several clashes with anti-whaling protesters and activists from various groups, including the Sea Shepherd Conservation Society, endeavoring to follow, document and disrupt the whaling fleet since the 2005–2006 season. On January 15, 2008, two crew members traveling on the MV Steve Irwin boarded the whaling ship Yushin Maru 2 without permission and were subsequently detained on board the ship for a number of days. Japan claimed that four crew members on board a Japanese whaling ship in Antarctic waters were injured March 3, 2008, when the anti-whaling group threw butyric acid on board.

Japan confirmed the later throwing of "flashbang" grenades onto the Sea Shepherd Conservation Society ship, MV Steve Irwin by their whaling factory ship, Nisshin Maru. Japan also confirmed firing a "warning shot" into the air. The captain of the Steve Irwin, Paul Watson, claimed to have been hit in the chest by a bullet from a Japanese whaling ship crewmember, and a piece of metal was found lodged into his bullet-proof vest he was wearing at the time. However, the Japanese government has denied the incident, but admitted that the whalers launched "noise balls", described as "loud explosive deterrent devices". On February 7, 2009, the MV Steve Irwin and the Yushin Maru No. 2 collided as the Japanese vessel was attempting to transfer a whale. Both sides claimed the other had been at fault.

In 2008, two Greenpeace anti-whaling activists, Junichi Sato and Toru Suzuki, also called the Tokyo Two were arrested and put on trial after trying to expose what they considered a theft ring within the whaling industry. An investigation was conducted into these practices, but was shortly ended concluding that the meat was taken as a souvenir and thus legal to possess. After his trial, Sato, Greenpeace Japan's Director of Oceans Campaign said that Greenpeace is moving away from a confrontational strategy and is using words to persuade Japan to end the hunts. He feels that outside groups do not have a good understanding of Japanese culture which can result in some actions having counter-productive results.

In January 2010, it was revealed that the Japanese whaling fleet was chartering flights in Australian planes from Hobart and Albany to track the Sea Shepherd ships' movements and provide information on their location to the whaling fleet so the fleet could evade them. The flights were heavily criticised by the Australian Greens.

On January 6, 2010, the anti-whaling ship MY Ady Gil suffered severe damage to its bow after a collision with the Japanese whaling ship Shōnan Maru No. 2. The Ady Gil was abandoned and left to sink after it had taken on too much water to be towed. While the first officer of the Bob Barker has said that all the fuel, oil, batteries and other environmental contaminates were removed from the Ady Gil before towing began, photographic evidence released by the Institute for Cetacean Research showed the wreckage continued to leak fuel into the Southern Ocean after it had been abandoned by Sea Shepherd.

Japan's Fisheries Agency announced on April 12, 2010, that the whaling fleet had caught about half of the 935 whales it sought to catch during the 2009–2010 whaling research season as a result of obstruction by Sea Shepherd Conservation Society protest operations. The whalers harvested 506 southern minke whales and one fin whale. In February 2011, the Sea Shepherd Conservation Society caused Japan to call off annual whaling in Antarctic waters.

Atsushi Ishii, Japanese political scientist and professor at Tohoku University's Center for Northeast Asian Studies stated in his 2011 book Kaitai Shinso: Hogei Ronso ("Anatomy of the Whaling Debate"), that Japan used the activities by conservationists like Sea Shepherd as a face-saving excuse to stop the unprofitable Antarctic hunt. Ishii asserts that the activities of environmental and animal rights activists were actually counterproductive because they fueled nationalism and increased the demand for whale meat in Japan. Ishii predicted that Japan would shift its whale hunting efforts to coastal waters and the Northwest Pacific.

In December 2011, the Japanese government confirmed that US$29 million from its supplementary post-earthquake and tsunami reconstruction budget was spent to provide extra security to ensure the "stable operation" of the Japanese whaling fleet.

After a lengthy legal case in the United States, the Sea Shepherd agreed not to harass Japan's whaling ships in August 2016, specifically not to physically attack Japan's whaling vessels or crew, nor to approach within 500 yards of the vessels on the high seas. Sea Shepherd's Australian branch however said they were not affected by the court ruling since the US court had no jurisdiction over Australian law.

=== International opposition ===
On March 6, 2008, members of the International Whaling Commission met in London to discuss reaching an agreement on whale conservation rules. Japanese whalers and anti-whaling activists clashed in the waters near Antarctica on March 7, 2008, with each side offering conflicting accounts of the confrontation. The IWC called upon the Sea Shepherd Conservation Society to refrain from dangerous actions and reiterated its condemnation of any actions that are a risk to human life and property in relation to the activities of vessels at sea.

Japan has continued to face accusations of vote-buying within the IWC, as an increasing number of developing countries with little or no tradition of whaling join. On March 8, 2008, Solomon Islands' Prime Minister Derek Sikua said that Japan had offered to pay for his country's delegates to attend the March 6, 2008, IWC meeting in London, and that he had refused the offer. The whaling chief at Japan's Fisheries Agency denied the allegation. A week before that IWC meeting, Japan hosted delegates from Angola, Cambodia, DR Congo, Equatorial Guinea, Eritrea, Ghana, Laos, Malawi, Palau, Tanzania and Vanuatu in Tokyo. The delegates also visited the traditional whaling town of Taiji in western Japan.

=== Commercial viability ===
Due to its low food self-sufficiency rate, around 40%, Japan relies on stockpiling to secure a stable food supply. As of 2009, Japan's 1.2 million ton seafood stockpile included nearly 5000 tons of whale meat. In 2005, the Japanese government began encouraging public schools to serve whale meat in school lunches as part of an initiative to reduce the country's stockpiles. A reported 18 percent of public elementary and junior high schools offering lunches served whale meat at least once during the 2009/2010 fiscal year. However, there has been criticism of serving whale meat to school children due to allegations of toxic methylmercury levels. The World Wildlife Fund has also estimated that the Japanese government has had to invest $12 million into the 2008–09 Antarctic whale hunt alone just to break even, and that subsidies in total have amounted to about $150 million since 1988.

One study found levels of mercury in whale red meat at six times the limit set by the US FDA for food. Whale meat can also be contaminated with polychlorinated biphenyls. Critics claim that, because of contamination, it constitutes a health risk. Thus, children and pregnant women are advised to refrain from eating whale meat. On April 1, 2014, online retailer Tauten asked its sellers to stop selling whale and dolphin meat by the end of the month. The notice was a result of Japan calling off the whale hunt following a ruling by the International Court of Justice. UK-based activist group Environmental Investigation Agency has accused Rakuten of being "the largest online seller of whale products".

== Media attention ==
Western media attention regarding Japan's whaling industry has increased. Animal Planet's television series, Whale Wars, places a camera crew on board the Sea Shepherd Conservation Society anti-whaling activist ships to document the annual interference with Japan's Antarctic whaling program. Japan has denounced the program as deceptive and supportive of eco-terrorists to increase ratings. Animal Planet has made requests to also film from the perspective of Japan's whaling fleet but the requests were denied.

The animated series South Park lampooned both Japan's whaling traditions and the anti-whaling activists featured on Whale Wars in the episode "Whale Whores".

A 2009 Oscar-winning documentary, The Cove, focused entirely on Japan's dolphin drive fisheries, mercury content of dolphin meat and the whaling town, Taiji. The film also concentrated on the difficulty in observing Taiji fishermen at work due to obstruction from the local police.

The New Zealander Peter James Bethune received a two-year suspended sentence after boarding the ship which collided with his boat the Ady Gil, which subsequently sank.

The New York Times reported the whaling town of Ayukawa, in Ishinomaki, Miyagi Prefecture, was badly damaged by the 2011 Tōhoku earthquake and tsunami. After the Fukushima Nuclear Disaster in 2011, radioactive cesium was found in two minke whales caught off the coast of Hokkaido.

== See also ==
- Aboriginal whaling
- Convention of Kanagawa
- International Convention for the Regulation of Whaling
- Oriental Bluebird
- Sea Shepherd's operations against Japanese whaling
