= Yūshin Maru =

Whaling ship built in 1998

- A render of the Yushin Maru type whale catcher.

History

Japan
- Name: Yūshin Maru
- Owner: Kyodo Senpaku Kaisha, Ltd.
- Operator: Institute of Cetacean Research
- Port of registry: Tokyo, Japan
- Builder: Hakata Zosen, Hakata
- Launched: 24 July 1998
- Identification: IMO number: 9197181; Call sign: JLZS; MMSI: 431439000
- Status: in active service

General characteristics
- Type: Whaler
- Tonnage: 1,025 gross tonnage (GT)
- Length: 69.61 m (228.4 ft) o/a
- Beam: 11.5 m (38 ft) (moulded)
- Height: 19.5 m (64 ft)
- Draft: 4.3 m (14 ft)
- Installed power: 5280 PS / 3900 kW

The Yūshin Maru (勇新丸, Yūshin Maru) is a Japanese-registered whale catcher that undertakes whaling operations in the North Pacific Ocean and Southern Ocean. Along with other vessels of the Japanese whaling fleet, she has been featured on American television since 2008, in the documentary-style reality series Whale Wars.

== Gallery ==
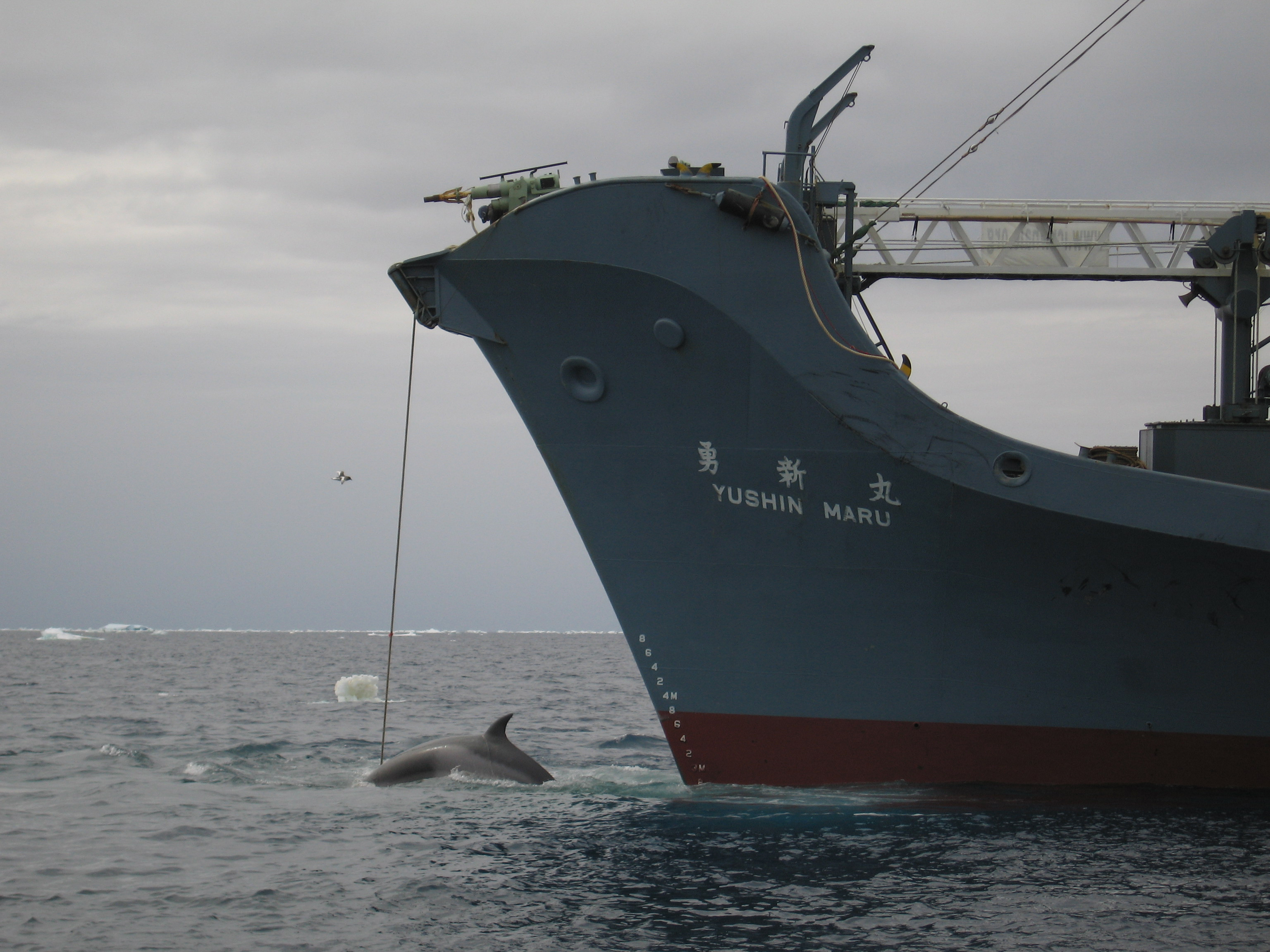
Yūshin Maru with a Whale

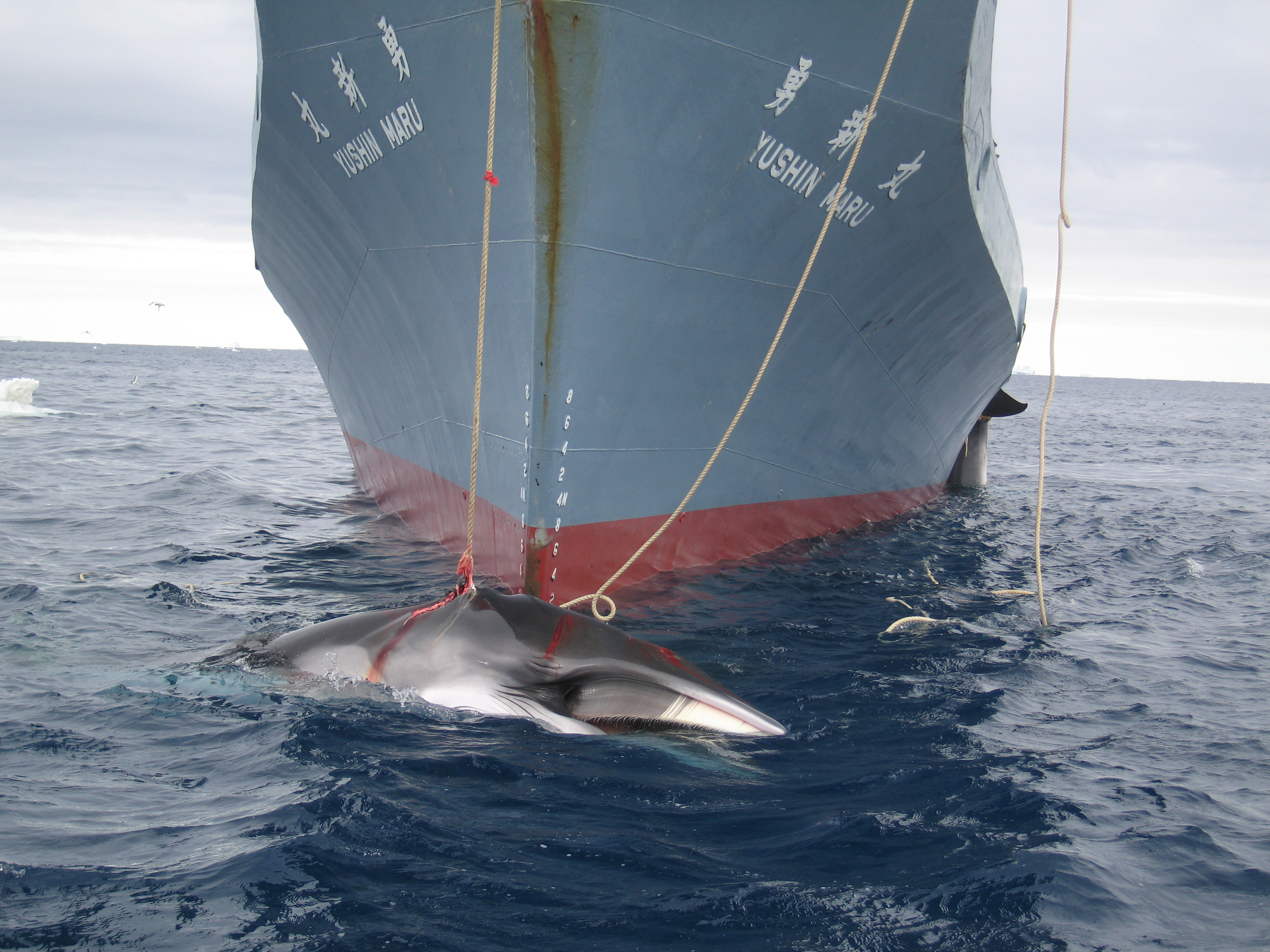
Yūshin Maru with a Whale

== See also ==
- Whaling in Japan
- Institute of Cetacean Research
