= Institute of Cetacean Research =

Controversial Japanese whaling body that purports to be focused on research

Institute of Cetacean Research 日本鯨類研究所
- Abbreviation: ICR
- Predecessor: Nakabe Scientific Research Centre (1941–1947); Whales Research Institute (1947–1987)
- Formation: October 1987
- Headquarters: Chūō, Tokyo, Japan
- Director General: Dr. Yoshihiro Fujise
- Parent organization: Japan Fisheries Agency
- Website: icrwhale.org

The Institute of Cetacean Research (ICR, 日本鯨類研究所, Nihon Geirui Kenkyūjo) is a Japanese research organization that claims to specialise in "biological and social sciences related to whales" but is widely believed to be a front for commercial whaling.

In the past, it killed several hundred whales per year in the name of its 'research', the validity and necessity of which has been called into question. Among its activities, the ICR also used to sell "whale research byproducts" commercially, which environmental groups denounced as commercial whaling in disguise, which is banned by the International Whaling Commission (IWC). In March 2014, the International Court of Justice formally ruled that the ICR's whaling program was not for scientific purposes, as claimed, and ordered Japan to immediately cease its operation.

In 2019, the Japanese government resumed commercial whaling, and, in March 2020, the ICR ended its sale of "whale research byproducts", claiming that the institute would only carry out non-lethal research moving forward.

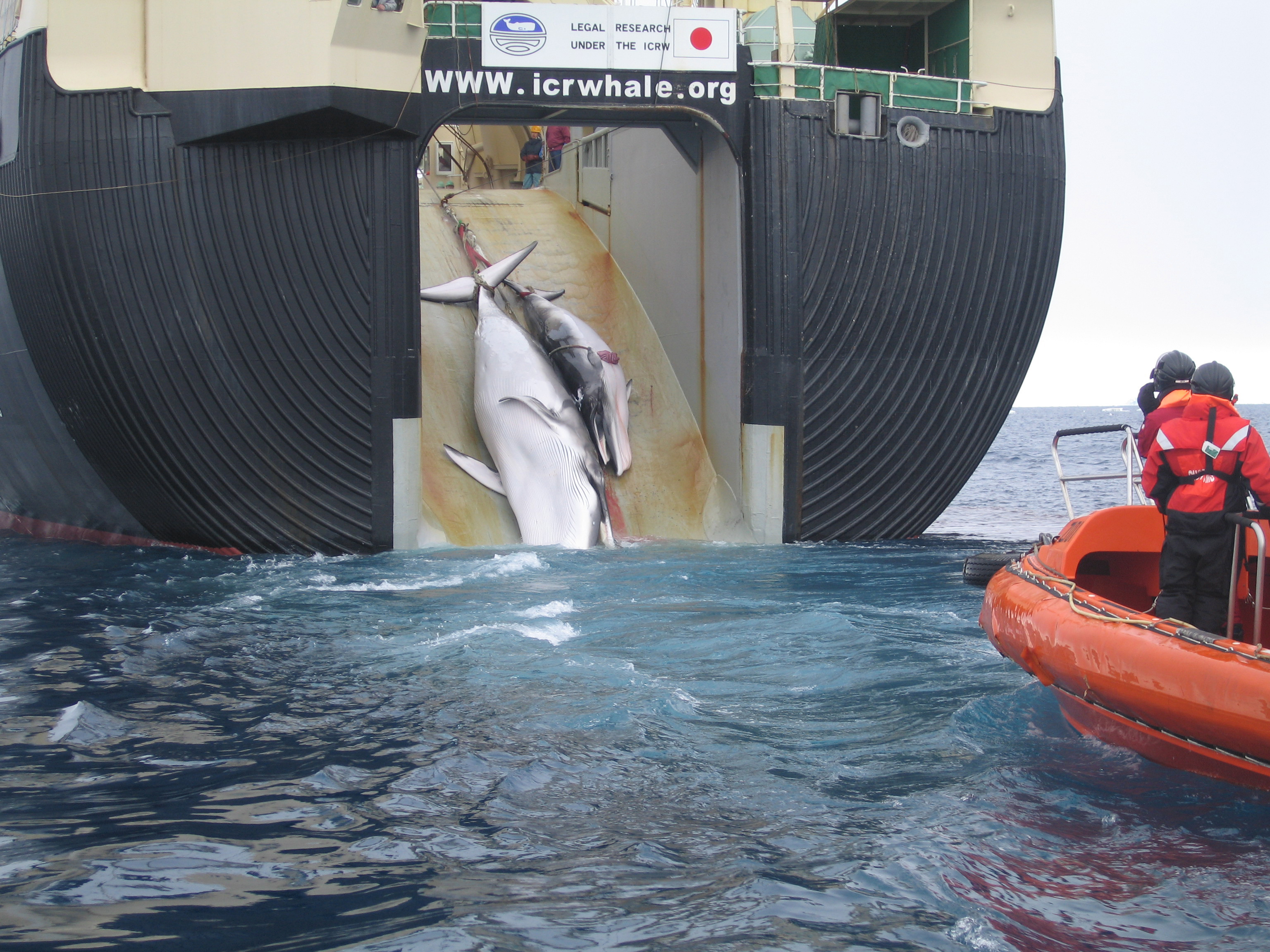
A Minke whale and her 1-year-old calf are hauled aboard the whaling factory ship, the Nisshin Maru. The image was taken by Australian customs agents in 2008. The ICR's web address is visible above the carcasses.

== History ==
The Institute of Cetacean Research was founded in 1987. It took over from the Whales Research Institute (founded in 1947), which grew out of the Nakabe Scientific Research Centre (founded in 1941). The New Zealand-based spokesman for the group is the public relations agent, Glenn Inwood.

The Whales Research Institute conducted research based on catches from commercial whaling. The International Whaling Commission (IWC) established a moratorium on commercial whaling after 1986. The ICR was established the following year to continue the "scientific research".

== Regulations ==
Under the International Convention for the Regulation of Whaling (ICRW), the IWC established a global ban on commercial whaling. Article VIII, Section 1 creates an exemption, however, providing that:

... any Contracting Government may grant to any of its nationals a special permit authorizing that national to kill, take and treat whales for purposes of scientific research subject to such restrictions as to number and subject to such other conditions as [that] Government thinks fit.

Further, Section 2 states:

Any whales taken under these special permits shall so far as practicable be processed and the proceeds shall be dealt with in accordance with directions issued by the Government by which the permit was granted.

Since its establishment, the institute has been granted annual catch quotas by the Government of Japan to carry out its research. The whale meat, which is by definition a by-product of the research, is sold for domestic consumption in accordance with the convention.

From 1988 through the first half of 2011, a total of 13,663 whales have been caught by the ICR under the above exemption for scientific research. Of those, 3,573 whales have been taken in the North Pacific Ocean, and 10,090 have been taken in the Southern Ocean, an area which in 1994 was designated as the Southern Ocean Whale Sanctuary by the IWC.

In March 2014 the International Court of Justice (ICJ) ordered Japan to cease the JARPA II programme stating that its Antarctic whaling was in contravention of the IWC moratoria 10(e) and 10(d).

== Research programs ==
Japanese whaling fell sharply after the global commercial whaling moratorium. The ICR may still kill whales for scientific purposes. The meat is then sold.

Under its whale research programs, the ICR collected its samples from the Antarctic Ocean and the northwestern Pacific Ocean under special permit from the Government of Japan (JARPA and JARPA II programs). It claims these samples were used for studies related to estimation of biological parameters, resource abundance, elucidation of stock structure, the role of whales in the marine ecosystem, and elucidation of the effect of environmental changes on cetaceans.

The ICR also claims to have conducted sighting surveys in the southern hemisphere and the North Pacific to elucidate trends in abundance, density, distribution, and behavior of whales. These surveys include the IWC Southern Ocean Whale and Ecosystem Research (SOWER) program.

=== JARPA (Antarctic Ocean) ===
The first Antarctic program took place from 1987 to 2005, with the stated objectives of trying to determine mortality rates, whale stock numbers and structure, the role of whales in the Antarctic ecosystem and how environmental changes are affecting whales. The whaling operation alternated between several pre-established areas intending to take 400 or more minke whales per season.

In 1997 the IWC scientific committee reviewed the JARPA program and disagreed on whether the ICR's lethal methods were necessary, but it was concluded that the results could potentially allow for an increase in the number of minke whales killed.

In the final 2007 review, the committee recognized that progress had been made in identifying stock structure but found problems with the age and mortality rate data and most of the ICR's other data collection and analysis efforts. The commission also noted the catches took place in the IWC established Southern Ocean Whale Sanctuary and that improving management of whaling in a sanctuary was unnecessary. The 2007-1 resolution on JARPA was one of several calling on Japan by majority vote to suspend its lethal research.

=== JARPN (northwestern Pacific Ocean) ===
From 1994 to 1999, the ICR carried out a program in the northwestern Pacific. Its stated goals were to improve knowledge of stock identity, improve implementation simulation trials for North Pacific common Minke whales and act as a feasibility study for a program on feeding ecology. The program called for 100 minke whales to be killed annually. The results were reviewed in February 2000 by the IWC committee, which agreed that the information was useful for management but reached no consensus on whether lethal methods of research were necessary. As with JARPA, the IWC issued resolutions calling for Japan to cease issuing permits for the take of Minke whales citing concerns over the need for lethal methods such as the 1999-3 Resolution on whaling under Special Permit.

=== JARPA II ===
The JARPA II Antarctic program began in 2005 and called for hunting 850 or more Antarctic minke whales, 50 fin whales and 50 humpback whales per season. The quota for humpback whales was not implemented due to intense international opposition. Disagreement over the value of the research, the use of lethal methods and the sample sizes continued in both the scientific committee and the commission. In 2005 and 2007 the commission passed resolutions by majority urging Japan to stop all lethal research in JARPA II.

On 31 March 2014, the International Court of Justice (ICJ) ruled that JARPA II was not for scientific purposes and forbade further permits. Following the ruling, Japan cancelled its Antarctic whaling hunt for the first time in more than 25 years, though it announced plans to propose a new research program designed to meet the standards set by the ICJ the following year.

=== JARPN II ===
JARPN II began with a feasibility study from 2000 to 2001 that included the killing of 100 common minke whales, 50 Bryde's whales, and 10 sperm whales. In 2002, after completing its initial study, the ICR proposed a longer-term program in the Pacific within Japan's Exclusive Economic Zone. In 2008 the program included a proposal for an annual take of 340 minke whales, 50 Bryde's whales, 100 sei and 10 sperm whales.

Disagreement over the objectives, methodology, effect on stocks and overall success of the program continued in the scientific committee review of the feasibility study and full program. The full program introduced a change from previous use of the ICRW Article VIII research provision by not specifying an end date. Despite this, its methodology was also not deemed likely to add significantly to previously identified research needs. Some IWC members contended the program placed undue emphasis on assumed negative effects of cetacean predation on fishery resources while failing to address the effects of fisheries on cetaceans. Others believed determining the effects of cetaceans on fish stocks and more information on Minke stock structure to be critically important.

Disagreement over the value of data obtained through lethal methods continued. It was argued that a wide range of questions could be answered through non-lethal means such as "for pollutant monitoring (biopsy sampling for fatty acid and stable isotope analysis), for stock structure (photo identification, biopsy sampling and faecal sampling), and for feeding ecology (faecal sampling)."

In 2000, 2001 and 2003, more resolutions were passed by the IWC urging Japan to cease issuing special permits for whaling and limit research to non-lethal methods. The most recent Scientific Committee review was conducted in January 2009.

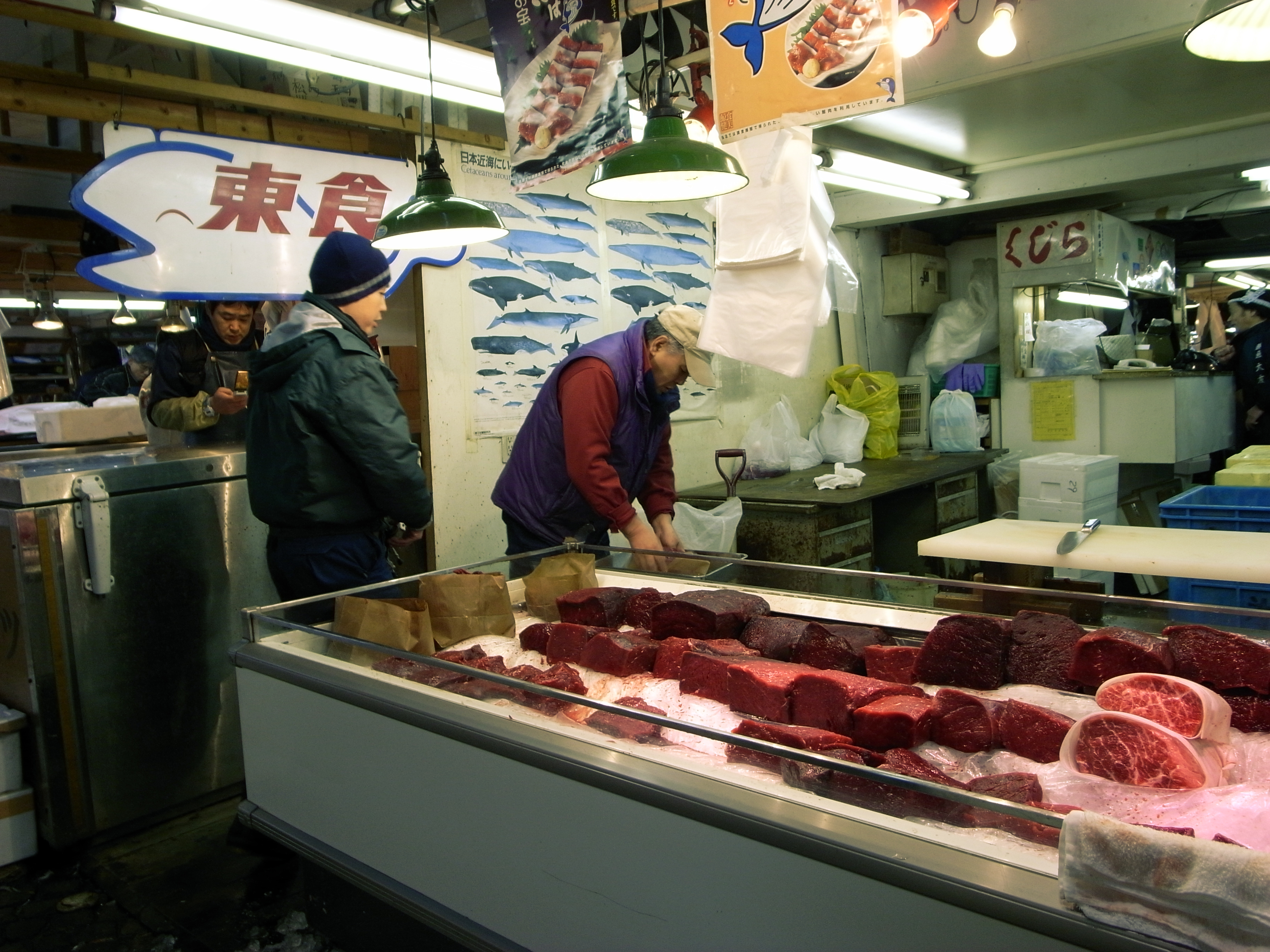
Whale meat for sale at Tsukiji fish market, Tokyo

== Controversy ==
Several environmental groups and governments oppose the Japanese research program, claiming it to be "a disguise for commercial whaling".

=== Disputes over research ===
The Institute of Cetacean Research has been reported to have "produced virtually no research of any regard" and has only two peer-reviewed papers since 2005.

In an open letter to the Japanese government, published in 2002 in the New York Times and sponsored by the World Wildlife Fund (WWF), 21 scientists declared that they "believe Japan's whale "research" program fails to meet minimum standards for credible science". They were "concerned that Japan's whaling program is not designed to answer scientific questions relevant to the management of whales; that Japan refuses to make the information it collects available for independent review; and that its research program lacks a testable hypothesis or other performance indicators consistent with accepted scientific standards". They accused Japan of "using the pretense of scientific research to evade its commitments to the world community".

The Institute of Cetacean Research responded by pointing out that it has produced numerous peer-reviewed articles on cetacean science, criticised the open letter as a case of scientists making judgments outside their own area of speciality, and raised concern about their responsibility as academics to the public. The ICR further noted that the letter contained numerous errors of science and law, reflecting the level of care taken by the scientists endorsing the letter.

A WWF official responded in the same journal, pointing out that "identical criticisms of Japanese whaling had been published by expert whale biologists on the International Whaling Commission's Scientific Committee" and that three of the letter's authors defending the Japanese programs had failed to disclose significant financial and organizational ties to the whaling industry.

In the same issue, twenty members of the Scientific Committee of the International Whaling Commission confirmed "that the signers of the open letter correctly summarized criticisms made by researchers very familiar with Japanese scientific whaling", a fact omitted by the letter's critics, "betraying a selectiveness that pervades their article". According to them, "so little of any significance to IWC management can be obtained only from whaling catches that it is impossible to justify killing animals on this basis".

The International Whaling Commission's Scientific Committee has repeatedly expressed concern for the objectives and results obtained by the ICR. In a resolution in 2007, the IWC noted that "none of the goals of JARPA 1 had been reached, and that the results of the JARPA 1 [Japanese Whale Research Program under Special Permit in the Antarctic] programme are not required for management under the RMP [Revised Management Procedure]" and called upon the Japanese government "to address the 31 recommendations listed in [the Scientific Committee's JARPA 1 report] to the satisfaction of the Scientific Committee" and "to suspend indefinitely the lethal aspects of JARPA II conducted within the Southern Ocean Whale Sanctuary".

In 2008 the ICR was criticized by anti-whaling proponents when photographs released by the Australian government showed pictures of the ICR harpoon ship Yushin Maru killing several different whales, and a whale and her calf being taken on board the Nisshin Maru for processing The Australian government used that opportunity to voice their disbelief of the ICR's scientific research claims:

"The scientists who have considered carefully the material that has been put forward by Japanese scientists in the past, making some claim that their whaling is scientific, have found that it is without foundation. ... You do not have to kill a whale in the Southern Ocean to gain a deeper understanding of it."

— The Hon Peter Garrett MP, Australia's Minister for the Environment, Heritage and the Arts

Animal rights groups such as Greenpeace and Sea Shepherd Conservation Society have repeatedly attacked the institute's vessels and personnel while carrying out their duties. In 2010, an employee of the institute reportedly sustained chemical burns to his face from a butyric acid projectile launched by a member of the Sea Shepherd organisation.

On December 17, 2012, the US Ninth Circuit Court of Appeals issued an injunction against Paul Watson, Sea Shepherd and any party acting in concert with them from physically attacking any person or vessel of the Institute of Cetacean Research and requiring them to stay at least 500 yd (457 m) from their vessels.

On March 31, 2014, the International Court of Justice ruled that Japan's whaling program was not for scientific purposes and forbade the granting of further permits. The court's judges agreed with Australia that the number of Japanese scientific research publications were not proportionate to the number of animals killed. Two former Australian Environment ministers applauded the decision and stated their hopes that Japan will respect it. The decision of the ICJ is final and the right of appeal does not apply in this context. Japan said it would abide by the decision.

In November 2014, Japan announced that it would resume hunting whales in the Southern Ocean but that it would reduce its catch target by two-thirds. Japan's Fisheries Agency said that Japan intends to catch 333 minke whales each year between 2015 and 2027, down from 935 minke and 50 fin whales. It said the hunts were needed for collecting scientific data and were exempt from a 1986 international ban on commercial whaling. The plan also included a defined 12-year period for research, in response to criticism from the ICJ of the previous open-ended research plans. In January 2015, the Japanese Fisheries Agency announced that the ICR was launching a non-lethal whale research programme until March 28. In 2017, the researchers at Catacean Research killed 333 minke whales in the name of whale research program, 67% of which were pregnant.

=== Financial subsidies ===
There are estimates by the World Wildlife Fund that the Japanese government has had to invest US$12 million into the 2008-2009 hunt alone just to break even, and that subsidies in total have amounted to approximately US$150 million between 1988 and 2010.

In 2011, the ICR was provided US$29 million in financial assistance from the earthquake recovery fund, a supplementary budget of US$230 billion passed by the Japanese Government for reconstruction after the March 11 earthquake and tsunami. The funding was provided to increase security for the whaling fleet in light of increasing attacks by Sea Shepherd Conservation Society and justified by the Japan Fisheries Agency as providing support to the whaling industry as a whole, including some whaling towns along the devastated northeast coast. No foreign or donated funds were used.

Following the September 2018 Florianopolis Declaration where the IWC rejected Japan's latest commercial hunt proposal and concluded that the purpose of the IWC is the conservation of whales, Japan withdrew its IWC membership on December 26, 2018. It then resumed commercial hunting in its territorial waters and exclusive economic zone on July 1, 2019, but ceased whaling activities in the Antarctic Ocean. Japan expects to hunt 227 minke whales by the end of 2019, but without government subsidies, their whaling industry is not expected to survive. A subsidy of 5.1 billion yen (US$47.31 million) was budgeted for commercial whaling in 2019. ICR activities continue.

== See also ==
- Southern Ocean Whale Sanctuary
- Whaling
- Whaling in Japan
