= List of Whale Wars episodes =

Whale Wars is a weekly American documentary-style reality television series that premiered on November 7, 2008, on the Animal Planet cable channel. The program follows Paul Watson, founder of the Sea Shepherd Conservation Society, as he and his crew aboard their various vessels attempt to deter Japanese whaling off the coast of Antarctica. The fourth season concluded on August 12, 2011.

A spin-off titled Whale Wars: Viking Shores features the Sea Shepherd trying to stop Whaling in the Faroe Islands. The spin-off season aired during 2012. Also aired in 2012 were two special episodes, "Operation Bluefin" and "Seal Wars".

Season 6 consisted of a special two-hour episode titled "Whale Wars: A Commander Rises", which was aired on December 13, 2013. It features the Sea Shepherds once again attempting to stop Japanese whaling in the Southern Ocean and the Southern Ocean Whale Sanctuary during the 2013 whaling season.

== Series overview ==
Season	Episodes		Original air dates	
Season	Total	Specials	Season premiere	Season finale
1	7	—N/a	November 7, 2008	December 19, 2008
2	11	—N/a	June 5, 2009	August 21, 2009
3	14	1	June 4, 2010	August 27, 2010
4	12	2	June 3, 2011	August 12, 2011
Viking Shores (Note: Spin-off series)	5	—N/a	April 27, 2012	May 18, 2012
5	8	—N/a	June 1, 2012	July 20, 2012
6	1 (Note: Season consisted of a single two-hour episode)	—N/a	December 13, 2013	
7	3	—N/a	January 2, 2015	
Other episodes	2	—N/a	—N/a	—N/a

== Episodes ==
=== Season 1 (2008) ===
Season 1 consisted of 7 episodes and aired from November 7, 2008, to December 19, 2008. Much of the action depicted in this season occurred between November 2007 and February 2008. Season One is now available on DVD.

The first season of Whale Wars was the most watched program ever for Animal Planet, capturing more than one million viewers for its season finale. Among adults aged 25–54, the series scored the highest viewer ratings in Animal Planet's history.

The first season also received the Television Academy Honors award. The Academy of Television Arts & Sciences created the Television Academy Honors in 2008 to recognize "Television with a Conscience" — achievements in programming that present issues of concern to our society in a compelling, emotional and insightful way.

No. overall	No. in season	Title	Original release date	Prod. code
1	1	"Needle in a Haystack"	November 7, 2008	101
Paul Watson is allegedly shot by the Japanese whaling crew during a confrontation between the whaling factory ship Nisshin Maru and the Sea Shepherd Conservation Society vessel MY Steve Irwin. The episode then flashes back to the maiden launching and departure of the vessel from home port three months earlier.
2	2	"Nothing's Ideal"	November 14, 2008	102
After weeks of searching, the Sea Shepherds finally spot a Japanese whaling ship, the harpoon ship Yūshin Maru No. 2. Watson devises a dangerous plan for two of his crew members to board the vessel and deliver a letter telling them to stop the killing of whales. He hopes to create an international incident, but his plan sparks a safety debate that divides the crew. Two volunteers enlist for the mission – Ben "Pottsy" Potts and Giles Lane – and the crew braces for the worst as the men jump over the railing of the enemy ship. They are immediately tied up by the Japanese whalers, and the Yūshin Maru No. 2 speeds away with the two Shepherds still aboard.
3	3	"International Incidents R Us"	November 21, 2008	103
Without negotiation and confrontation with the Steve Irwin, the Yūshin Maru No. 2 agreed to transfer Pottsy and Giles to a government ship that would then meet with the Steve Irwin at a rendezvous point to return the two members. 1st Mate Peter Brown decides to launch an attack on the Yūshin Maru No. 2 at dusk. Four crew-members are sent on the Zodiac inflatable boat Delta to carry out the risky mission. After losing radio contact with them, reconnaissance helicopter pilot Chris Aultman, who was sent too late to survey the situation, reports that they are heading in the wrong direction and must return as night falls. The lone Delta was feared to be forever lost out in the middle of the dark, frigid, vast Antarctic Ocean. Fortunately, contact was finally made with the Delta, which eventually returns to the Steve Irwin over two hours later and behind schedule to retrieve Pottsy and Giles.
4	4	"We Are Hooligans"	November 28, 2008	104
Giles Lane and Ben Potts safely return to the Steve Irwin. The crew then discovers that an unknown ship, allegedly spying for the Japanese whaling fleet, has been following them, and decides to perform a reconnaissance mission from behind a tabletop iceberg for any military personnel aboard, and temporarily drives it away after seeing no sign of illegal military activity. The crew later plans to ambush the mystery ship, soon identified as the Fukuyoshi Maru No. 68, to prevent information about the Steve Irwin's whereabouts from being given to the rest of the whaling fleet. They plan to do this by boarding the vessel and sabotaging its communication equipment, shutting off any communication with anyone. Before the mission, a hydraulic crane used to launch the motor rafts somehow got damaged, jeopardizing the Sea Shepherd Conservation Society's mission.
5	5	"Doors Slamming and Things Breaking"	December 5, 2008	105
The Steve Irwin experiences several technical difficulties, including a damaged engine, hydraulic crane, and helicopter. Running on only one engine, the ship must return to port at Melbourne, Australia to make repairs while the whaling continues. Some crew-members decide to party and leave the operation. Upon arrival, they were warmly greeted and cheered by the citizens, and by the police. Pottsy and Giles become instant celebrities on homecoming. After recruiting new members, the crew travels without its reconnaissance helicopter and returns to the Southern Ocean only to find that the suspicious ship is still following them.
6	6	"Ladies First"	December 12, 2008	106
After noticing that the suspicious ship Fukuyoshi Maru No. 68 has found and followed the Steve Irwin again, but the Sea Shepherd crew successfully hides in a field of icebergs and the Fukuyoshi Maru No. 68 passes by and loses their trail. The Steve Irwin detects one of the Yūshin Maru harpoon ships on radar and Watson unsuccessfully attempts to send four female crew members to board the vessel to deliver a warrant. This leads to a man's injured thumb and a woman's injured pelvis (Incidents not related). At dusk, the entire ship experiences a power outage, leaving it drifting through an iceberg field without operating engines.
7	7	"Boiling Point"	December 19, 2008	107
After power was restored to part of the ship, the Steve Irwin finally finds, follows, and comes face to face two times with the Japanese whaling factory ship Nisshin Maru, which Watson considers the "most evil" vessel in international waters. A pod of whales swims between the two "warring" ships, which eventually engage in a ship-to-ship "battle." The captain of the Nisshin Maru warned on a recorded message sent multiple times through a horn that "If you dare board this vessel, you will be taken into custody." Recruited Sea Shepherds are the first to strike, throwing stink bombs with butyric acid onto the decks of the Nisshin Maru, which dwarfed the Steve Irwin in size, while its crew watches and films the Steve Irwin. The Japanese whalers claim that three of their crew-members were injured by the stink bombs. When the two ships meet the second time, the Steve Irwin crew strikes first again while the Nisshin Maru crew, in return, threatens to use tear gas grenades and throws flash bombs. Watson fishes a metallic fragment from his vest and claims to have been shot. As Watson concluded that the second leg of the mission was successful, the Sea Shepherds claimed that they have saved about 500 whales. The Steve Irwin returns to Melbourne again before running out of fuel.

=== Season 2 (2009) ===
The second season of Whale Wars premiered on Animal Planet in the United States on June 5, 2009, in Canada on June 10, 2009, and in the United Kingdom on October 6, 2009. The season was recorded between December 2008 and February 2009.

No. overall	No. in season	Title	Original release date	Prod. code
8	1	"The Sound of Ice"	June 5, 2009	201
The series starts with a dramatic encounter with the Japanese Whaling fleet. The episode then flashes back to the maiden launching and departure of the vessel from home port two months earlier. Paul Watson and the Sea Shepherds head back down to Antarctica for what promises to be their most intense anti-whaling campaign yet. However, no sooner does the ship leave port than the ship's Gyro breaks and they hit a massive storm the size of Australia.
9	2	"The Flexibility of Steel"	June 12, 2009	202
A huge weather system moves in and the Steve Irwin is forced to take shelter behind a large iceberg. By morning, they are surrounded by ice so thick they can no longer move. The ice begins to push against the aging ship's fragile hull, denting it inwards.
10	3	"As Bad as Our Bark"	June 19, 2009	203
The Sea Shepherd gather intelligence on the fleet's location, they realize that they are low on fuel. As they weigh whether or not to head back to port, they come across the entire Japanese fleet searching for one of their crew-members that has either fallen overboard or committed suicide by jumping overboard.
11	4	"Yum Yum, Eat Crow"	June 26, 2009	204
The Sea Shepherds have come across the entire Japanese fleet searching for one of their crew-members that fell overboard. Paul orders his crew to stand down, and they agonize over being so close to their target, yet unable to attack.
12	5	"The Unintimidatables"	July 10, 2009	205
The Steve Irwin is quarantined in Hobart and the crew anxiously waits to find out if they have been exposed to Anthrax. Finally they get the all clear and 1st mate Peter Brown wastes no time leaving the ship after having quit the campaign.
13	6	"With a Hook"	July 17, 2009	206
Surrounded by the Japanese whaling fleet, the Sea Shepherds ready themselves for their biggest day of battle to date on the campaign. Helicopter pilot Chris flies up and confirms the crew's fears — all of the whaling vessels are equipped with LRADs. Additionally the Nisshin Maru has covered itself in netting, making the deployment of the butyric acid nearly impossible. The Gemini tries to deploy a prop-fouler, but after several attempts, the harpoon ship manages to take fouling line out of the water. The LRAD device is seen, but not turned on.
14	7	"The Desire to Fling Things"	July 24, 2009	207
Watson is in pursuit of the Nisshin Maru when all three Japanese harpoon ships suddenly appear on out of the fog. The Sea Shepherds are completely outnumbered.
15	8	"Bait and Switch"	July 31, 2009	208
As the Sea Shepherds prepare for their fourth straight day of engagement with the Japanese whaling fleet, Andy and Simon argue with Dan over the best strategy for attack.
16	9	"The Crazy Ivan"	August 7, 2009	209
Low on fuel, the small boats head toward the Steve Irwin, but in order to get them on board safely, Paul must employ a dangerous military strategy, "The Crazy Ivan," circling at a high speed to try and create calm water for the little boats to return.
17	10	"The Stuff of Nightmares"	August 14, 2009	210
The Sea Shepherds shock turns to fury when the Japanese fleet hauls in a killed whale for processing. Paul Watson instructs the crew to prepare for battle, but Japanese water cannons disorient the Sea Shepherds, causing them to miss the throw. Another Japanese whaling ship transfers another dead whale later. But afterwards the Yūshin Maru No. 3 harpoons and kills a whale in front of the Sea Shepherd crew.
18	11	"Overlooking a Forlorn Shore"	August 21, 2009	211
Season Finale.The Sea Shepherds continue to attempt to disrupt the whaling fleet's operations. When the Yūshin Maru No. 3 tries to transfer a dead whale to the Nisshin Maru, Captain Watson intercedes by attempting to block the whale transfer with the Steve Irwin. The Yūshin Maru moves in, attempting to prevent Watson from blocking the transfer, but the two ships collide; both sides blame each other for causing the collision.

=== Season 3 (2010) ===
At the start of the 2009–10 campaign, Marjorie Kaplan, president and general manager of Animal Planet, said in a news release: "The issues surrounding whaling in the southern ocean are important and complex. The majesty of these beautiful creatures and the lengths to which the Sea Shepherds will go in order to prevent whaling has made Whale Wars intense and vital television." She also said that Japan had denied requests to film on their vessels.

A "sneak preview" trailer of the new season was released by Animal Planet on May 18, 2010. The preview shows the use of laser dazzlers and projectile launchers by Sea Shepherd.

No. overall	No. in season	Title	Original release date	Prod. code
19	1	"Surrounded By Spies"	June 4, 2010	301
The third season opens with Captain Paul Watson leading three ships from different ports on a campaign against whaling in the Antarctic. However, both the MY Ady Gil and the MY Bob Barker experience setbacks, preventing them from joining the Steve Irwin. One of the Japanese whaling ships, the MV Shōnan Maru 2, soon follows the Steve Irwin in order to alert the whaling fleet. Watson and the Sea Shepherds take evasive action.
20	2	"Crossing Danger"	June 11, 2010	302
The Shōnan Maru 2 continues to closely follow the Steve Irwin. The Sea Shepherds force the Japanese ship to back off so they can safely stow the helicopter. Meanwhile the crew of the Bob Barker successfully repair their broken main engines and get underway to rendezvous with the Steve Irwin. The Ady Gil suffers the loss of two crew members and brings in two more former Earthrace members along with a new radar. Back in Antarctic waters, the Steve Irwin steers into an ice pack in a failed attempt to lose the Shōnan Maru 2 tailing them.
21	3	"From Hell's Heart"	June 18, 2010	303
Unable to lose the tail of the Shōnan Maru 2, the Steve Irwin heads north to meet up with the Ady Gil. Once at the meeting point, Pete Bethune boards the Steve Irwin and plans are made to stop the Shōnan Maru 2 with the help of the Ady Gil, to allow the Steve Irwin to escape. The Bob Barker meanwhile tries to make up time by sailing straight through a huge storm, taking on damage on the way and endangering the whole mission.
22	4	"Stealth Attack"	June 25, 2010	304
The Ady Gil tries to stop the Shōnan Maru 2 from tailing the Steve Irwin, but is unsuccessful. Captain Watson therefore decides to head for Hobart to replenish supplies and lose its tail, as the whaling vessel is not allowed in Australian waters. The Bob Barker receives a tip from an antarctic cruise ship about the whereabouts of the whaling fleet. They head for the coordinates and find a harpoon ship and later the Nisshin Maru. They call the Ady Gil for help.
23	5	"The Thrill of the Chase"	July 9, 2010	305
The Ady Gil engages the Nisshin Maru in order to help the slower Bob Barker catch up with the factory ship. But the Bob Barker can't keep up and launches one of its inflatables to slow down the Nisshin Maru. Due to rough weather the inflatable can't gain ground and has to be picked up again, slowing the Bob Barker down further. Meanwhile four harpoon ships are approaching the Bob Barker, trying to keep it away from the factory ship. Low on fuel, the Ady Gil makes one last attempt at prop fouling the Nisshin Maru, this time with success.
24	6	"Sliced in Two"	July 16, 2010	306
Low on fuel, the Ady Gil sits dead in the water, with the trailing harpoon ships passing by closely. Then the Shōnan Maru 2 aims directly for the Ady Gil, slicing it in two. After some nerve-wracking time without communication, the crew of the Ady Gil sends out a Mayday call. The Bob Barker responds and launches an inflatable. All crew-members survive, but one person is injured. An attempt is made to tow the damaged Ady Gil to a nearby research base in Antarctica. As the boat takes on too much water, a decision is made to abandon the Ady Gil, which was emptied of the fuel left on board.
25	7	"Revenge is Mine"	July 23, 2010	307
On the Bob Barker, plans are made for Pete Bethune to board the still trailing Shōnan Maru 2, the same ship that sank his Ady Gil. On the Steve Irwin, a serious malfunction of the helicopter occurs, an unsuccessful repair and test flight lead to the grounding of the aircraft. A breach in the fresh water tank of the Bob Barker causes a loss of 90% of the water, endangering the whole mission. To replenish their supplies, the crew picks up pieces from an iceberg. Finally Pete Bethune tries to board the Shōnan Maru 2 with the help of one of the Bob Barker's inflatables.
26	8	"Ready to Snap"	July 30, 2010	308
Pete Bethune's attempt to board the Shōnan Maru 2 is aborted. Some of the Ady Gil's crew on the Bob Barker want to go home, and later have an argument with Chuck. The Bob Barker's engineer discovers that they are critically low on engine oil. On the Steve Irwin, a decision is made to go to port to fix the grounded helicopter, and a plan emerges to rendezvous with the Bob Barker to transfer water and engine oil and pick up the Ady Gil's crew to take back to port. The rendezvous is conducted in French waters so the Shōnan Maru 2 cannot follow. During the rendezvous, a storm damages the small inflatable boats, one of which goes adrift. The next day, an attempt to recover the drifting boat almost succeeds but an unwise attempt to use its engine in shallow water ruins its propeller. With their resources dwindling, the two boats separate again, and the Bob Barker makes a decision to avoid the Shōnan Maru 2 by steaming towards a storm.
27	9	"A Bloody Trail"	August 6, 2010	309
The Bob Barker spots the Nisshin Maru. After a brief discussion of using the helicopter offensively, rather than defensively, Paul Watson is aware of at least three harpoon ships moving in on the Bob Barker as darkness falls upon the night and freezing rain frightens the crew. To kill time, one of the deckhands, Malcolm Holland, skydives out of a helicopter and glides back onto the deck with a perfect landing to a warm round of applause and cheers, especially from the captain and helicopter pilot. The cheerful atmosphere quickly fades as they close in on the Nisshin Maru and get outflanked by the four harpoon boats which encircle and trap the Bob Barker inside their perimeter. Once the harpoon boats has formed a circular ring around the Bob Barker, the Nisshin Maru tries to make a fast break. With no other choice and time running out, the Sea Shepherds try to break the blockade. The plan does not go according to plans as the Bob Barker collides with one of the harpoon ships on its starboard side, ripping a hole in the steel hull.
28	10	"Zero Hour"	August 13, 2010	310
The deckhands rappel over the side of the ship to assess the damage from the collision and realize that there is a hole in the steel hull. The gash is above the waterline so there is no fear of the ship sinking but water is coming in as it splashes against the hull. Unable to stop for fear of losing the factory ship, and due to the wet conditions, a permanent patch cannot be welded on and a makeshift patch of raincoats and Styrofoam blocks are used to hold back most of the water. The collision appears to have shaken the Japanese as well as they hang back with their harpoon ships. This allows the Bob Barker to take up position blocking the slipway at the rear of the Nisshin Maru. News reaches the Steve Irwin of the Barker's success, encouraging the crew. Attempting to catch the Barker and the Japanese fleet, Watson realizes that the Japanese are heading right for them. Less than a day later, the Steve Irwin spots the fleet and the Barker. Watson rendezvous with Barker and takes up the lead position behind the slipway while the Barker falls back to block the harpoon boats should they try to make a move. Now with two ships working in tandem, the Sea Shepherds have completely shut down the Japanese fleet's whaling operation. For the next four days, the factory ship is unable to process any whales nor are the harpoon ships able to shake the Sea Shepherds off the Nisshin Maru. Watson then begins to plot their next move to harass the factory ship and its crew.
29	11	"Fire in the Sky"	August 20, 2010	311
As the Steve Irwin attacks the Nisshin Maru with its water cannon, the two ships nearly collide. In an all around engagement, the Steve Irwin's helicopter is about to launch, as one of the harpoon ships comes closer, threatening the delicate aircraft with its water cannon. The Bob Barker comes to help, covering the stern of the Steve Irwin. On one of the inflatables, Pete Bethune decorates the side of the Nisshin Maru with the help of his spud gun and red paint. As the inflatable engages one of the harpoon ships, the whalers use backpack water cannons to keep them at distance. The Bob Barker starts trailing a heavy stern line, in order to prop foul the Nisshin Maru. By cutting across their bow, they try to deploy the line just in time, but fail to stop the factory ship.
30	12	"Vendetta"	August 27, 2010	312
Pete Bethune uses photographs of the Shōnan Maru 2 taken from the helicopter to plan his boarding attempt. In the meantime, the Japanese fleet steers into a storm hoping to lose the Sea Shepherds. Paul Watson defends a claim by the Japanese that the Sea Shepherds actions injured their crews with acid burns, and postulates that the Japanese crew actually sprays themselves when they use pepper spray to defend their ship. The Steve Irwin attempts to flood the Nisshin Maru's engine room by directing their water cannon into its exhaust funnel, but it doesn't work. They then use the small boats to cover the Nisshin Maru's slipway with butyric acid, it meets with more success. However, the Shōnan Maru 2 leaps at the opportunity when one of the small boats' engines die, and it is rescued just in time. Pete Bethune demonstrates a well-thought-out plan to board the Shōnan Maru 2. As the episode ends, the boarding attempt is put into motion.
31	13	"To the Ends of the Earth"	August 27, 2010	313
Pete Bethune's boarding of the Shōnan Maru 2 commences; after several tense minutes of waiting, the Sea Shepherds receive words that he has succeeded despite the Japanese ship's defenses. At daylight, the helicopter is launched to document Bethune confronting of the Shōnan Maru's captain. He disappears into the bridge, and after the confrontation, no more is seen of him. The Sea Shepherds resume their pursuit of the factory ship, which makes a sudden course change, separating it from Bethune on the Shōnan Maru 2. As the Shōnan Maru 2 disappears, the Sea Shepherds call Bethune a hero because his custody will carry awareness of the whaling controversy long past the end of the whaling season, and a media frenzy erupts on Bethune's boarding and capture. As they pursue the Nisshin Maru into Antarctic pack ice, the Bob Barker's larger fuel capacity and better ice-worthiness puts it in the lead while the Steve Irwin falls back and eventually leaves for port when their fuel runs low. The Sea Shepherds learn that the whaling fleet is more than 500 whales short of their quota, the most successful season they have had to date.
32	14	"From Pirate to Prisoner"	September 6, 2010	314
More details are released involving Pete Bethune's arrest. A full interview is conducted with Pete Bethune after his arrest in Japan.

=== Season 4 (2011) ===
The ten-episode fourth season began airing on Animal Planet on June 3, 2011. The campaign includes a new interceptor vessel joining the Sea Shepherd fleet – MV Gojira (or Godzilla) – replacing the role of the Ady Gil.

No. overall	No. in season	Title	Original release date	Prod. code
33	0	"Road To The Showdown"	June 3, 2011	400
Recap of the first three seasons.
34	1	"Battle Cry"	June 3, 2011	401
The episode begins with the three Sea Shepherd ships regrouping. The crews of the Steve Irwin and the MY Bob Barker cheer as their new vessel, the Gojira arrives in port. The fleet then departs and separates to search for the Japanese whaling fleet. After encountering heavy swells, the crew of the Bob Barker notice that their fuel tank is leaking, and work to fix it. The Bob Barker spots a ship on the horizon, revealed to be the Yūshin Maru. The crew celebrates, having found the whaling fleet only days after setting sail. The Steve Irwin also spots another harpoon ship.
35	2	"No Escape"	June 10, 2011	402
The crew of the Gojira witness the breathtaking views and wildlife they are there to protect. The Sea Shepherd vessels combine forces to find the Nisshin Maru factory ship. A new helicopter donated by American game show host Bob Barker gets its first use. The Bob Barker and the Steve Irwin start to be followed by the harpoon ships.
36	3	"Ghosts in the Machine"	June 17, 2011	403
Still being tailed by the Yūshin Maru No. 2, the Steve Irwin slows down to refuel the Gojira. To do so the bigger ship trails a stern line to tow the Gojira during refueling, but the trimaran gets prop fouled in the process. A diver is able to untangle the propeller. On the second attempt, this time with a floating line, the refueling is successful. On the Bob Barker, the Nisshin Maru is possibly seen on the radar, but they are too far away to follow. They call the Steve Irwin's helicopter to perform reconnaissance. After some battery problems they jump start the aircraft. The Steve Irwin orders the now refueled Gojira to engage the Yūshin Maru No. 2, so they can escape. But the Gojira develops engine problems and is unable to keep up with the harpoon ship, which closes in again on the Steve Irwin. After a search the helicopter pilot is unable to locate the Nisshin Maru and lands on the Bob Barker. The pilot exchanges information with the crew and heads back for the Steve Irwin. During flight both Sea Shepherd ships lose communication with the helicopter.
37	4	"The Devil's Icebox"	June 24, 2011	404
The Bob Barker tries to lose its tail by deploying both its small boats in an attempt to distract the Japanese ship to escape. The small boat crews set a tracking device on one of the Yūshins and the Bob Barker manages to escape the ship's radar range. However, as the small boats race to rendezvous with the Bob Barker, one of the boats is found to be damaged and the boats must return to their original position to be picked up by the Bob Barker, which is now five hours away. This leaves the small boat crews out in the Antarctic air for more than half a day total. The crew begins to develop signs of hypothermia.
38	5	"Tracking the Enemy"	July 8, 2011	405
The Bob Barker returns to the last known coordinates of the small boats, the boats are eventually recovered, with two of their crew suffering from hypothermia. The Gojira spots a refueling ship which they believe has been commissioned by the whaling fleet. The Sea Shepherd fleet regroups to follow the tracking device placed on one of the Yūshins, but the signal is eventually lost. The Bob Barker is once again being tailed by a whaling ship. The Gojira is forced to return to port due to mechanical problems. Watson orders his fleet to interfere with the bunker ship Sun Laurel from resupplying of the Japanese whaling fleet.
39	6	"Race to Save Lives"	July 15, 2011	406
The New Zealand Navy contacts the Steve Irwin and asks the Sea Shepherds to respond to an emergency distress signal from a Norwegian sailboat with five crew members that have gone missing. The Steve Irwin sails to the ship’s last known position and launches its helicopter to aid their search. Despite their efforts, they are unable to find them. Ultimately, the New Zealand Navy calls off the search and the Sea Shepherds continue to search for the Japanese factory ship, the Nisshin Maru.
40	7	"Enemy in Their Grasp"	July 22, 2011	407
The Sea Shepherd battles exhaustion to search for the whalers' factory ship, the Nisshin Maru. The search is especially hard on helicopter pilot Chris Aultman, who spends a long time searching from the sky. After receiving an anonymous tip, the Steve Irwin locates the Nisshin Maru. The Nisshin in an attempt to lose the Sea Shepherds sails directly into an ice field, forcing them to go around. After several hours, they lost the sight of the Nisshin Maru. Running low on fuel, the Steve Irwin is forced to return to port.
41	8	"Battle Stations"	July 29, 2011	408
With its engines repaired, the Gojira returns to action. The Bob Barker again attempts to lose its tail. After a successful prop-fouling attempt, the Yūshin Maru 3 is stopped but sends out a distress signal, forcing the Sea Shepherds to halt its escape. The Yūshin again chases the Bob Barker, but yet another successful prop-fouling allows the Bob Barker to move beyond the whaler's radar range. Afterwards, the Sea Shepherd fleet continues to search for the Japanese factory ship and, after several days of search, the Gojira finally spots the Nisshin Maru.
42	9	"The Giant Enemy"	August 5, 2011	409
The Gojira engages the Nisshin Maru, hoping to slow them down so that the Bob Barker can catch up. The Nisshin tries to escape by heading straight toward an ice field. Just before they manage to escape, the Bob Barker finally arrives to take the lead in following the whaling fleet. The Sea Shepherds are surprised to see the Yūshin Maru 3 arriving to the area as well. The Steve Irwin leaves port after refueling and is set to rendezvous with the rest of the Sea Shepherds.
43	10	"Delivering the Final Blow"	August 12, 2011	410
The Nisshin Maru, continues to sail east away from their designated whaling ground, hoping to run the Bob Barker out of fuel. The Steve Irwin and the Gojira race to rejoin the action but will not get there in time. Recognizing that the whalers are circumnavigating around Antarctica through Chilean water, the Sea Shepherds contact Chile authorities, who promise to seize the Nisshin Maru if the ship enters their water. The whaling fleet is forced to U-turn and heads back toward the whaling ground. The Sea Shepherds later receive unofficial words that Japan has suspended whaling, but the Nisshin Maru's course suggests otherwise. After the Bob Barker tails the ship for several days, Japan officially abandons the season’s whaling campaign as the Nisshin Maru heads north back toward Japan.
44	11	"War Stories"	August 12, 2011	411
A one-hour interview show with Paul Watson and other crew members, looking back at the events that took place during Operation No Compromise. The show was hosted by journalist Lisa Ling.

=== Viking Shores (2012) ===
The six-episode spin-off season began airing on Animal Planet on April 27, 2012.

No. overall	No. in season	Title	Original release date	Prod. code
45	1	"Bad Blood"	April 27, 2012	102
The MV Brigitte Bardot heads for the Faroe Islands alone trying to stop whale hunting. The MY Steve Irwin is detained in Scotland for damaging properties of a fishing company in the Mediterranean Sea while attempting to free Atlantic bluefin tuna (detailed in the "Operation Bluefin" special episode below). The Sea Shepherds are not welcome in the Faroes due to past encounters. The crew of the Brigitte Bardot speaks to the Faroese about whaling but are warned not to interfere with whale hunting. Meanwhile, the Sea Shepherds try to smuggle acoustic devices which would be placed underwater along the coast to dispel whales from swimming toward the Faroes, but their attempt is discovered and the devices confiscated.
46	2	"Battle Cry"	May 4, 2012	103
The Brigitte Bardot and a covert land team continue to patrol the shores of the Faroe Islands for signs of whale hunting. At one location, the crew discovers what they thought are fresh whale bones scattering on the sea bed, which would indicate that whaling has already begun. Meanwhile, the Steve Irwin cannot leave Scotland until a bond is paid, forcing Paul Watson to embark on a fundraising campaign. Eventually, the bond is paid and the ship is allowed to leave. The Sea Shepherds receive news that there is an arrest warrant for Watson, but Watson decides to head for the Faroes anyway. Upon arrival, however, Watson is not arrested.
47	3	"Into the Fire"	May 11, 2012	104
Acting on a tip that a hunt is underway in Vestmanna, both the Sea Shepherd ships and the land team rush to the site to try and intervene, only to find the cove empty and the town deserted. It is then learned that the residents of the town have traveled to the capital city to partake in the annual festival of Ólavsøka. Paul Watson has the land team head to the festival with graphic images of slaughtered pilot whales on their van; they are eventually forced to leave the festival by local authorities. Later on the Brigitte Bardot docks in Tórshavn harbor where they are harassed by locals throughout the night, culminating in one resident attempting to cast off the ship's mooring lines the following morning.
48	4	"Friends and Enemies"	May 18, 2012	105
The crew of the Brigitte Bardot contacts police and the local who was tampering with the mooring lines leaves after receiving a warning. The Sea Shepherd vessels and the land team continue to patrol the shores for signs of whales. A helicopter and an ultralight aircraft are launched from the Steve Irwin to aid the search. However, the Sea Shepherds are forced to ground the ultralight after receiving words that such aircraft are illegal. The land team discovers a large number of boats gathering at one location. Realizing that this could be a sign that whaling is about to take place, the Sea Shepherds send all their assets there to investigate.
49	5	"Collision Course"	May 18, 2012	106
The Sea Shepherds discover that the boats are simply gathering for a row boat race, not for a whale hunt. The Sea Shepherds are continuing their patrols of the Faroe Islands when they receive word that the Japanese whaling fleet which they had been opposing for years is preparing to return to the Southern Ocean Whale Sanctuary to resume operations. The news forces the Sea Shepherds to conclude their operations in the Faroe Islands in order to redeploy to Antarctica. On the final day of operations in the Faroes, the Sea Shepherds find a large pod of pilot whales and successfully drive them away from the islands. While no major whale hunts occurred during the Sea Shepherds' visit, it is revealed that one took place a week after the departure of Sea Shepherd with over 100 pilot whales being killed.

=== Season 5 (2012) ===
No. overall	No. in season	Title	Original release date	Prod. code
50	1	"Setting the Trap"	June 1, 2012	501
The Sea Shepherds are shocked to learn that the Japanese whaling fleet is preparing to leave Japan and return to the Southern Ocean to resume whaling. They also learn that the whalers have appropriated approximately $30 million in relief funds intended for the 2011 Tōhoku earthquake and tsunami to augment their security measures, though the full extent of these new security measures are unknown. The Sea Shepherds scramble to intercept the whalers, planning to intercept them south of Indonesia before they can reach the whaling grounds. The short notice also results in Sea Shepherds' helicopter pilot Chris Aultman being unavailable for the campaign, leaving an inexperienced replacement pilot to fill in for him. The Brigitte Bardot detects multiple targets on its radar and the helicopter confirms it to be the whaling fleet, including their primary target; the Nisshin Maru.
51	2	"Games of Chance"	June 8, 2012	502
After discovering the Nisshin Maru, the Steve Irwin and the Brigitte Bardot prepare to converge on it. However, when the helicopter goes to find it, it has already disappeared. However, the helicopter suddenly finds another ship, which turns out to be the remodeled security ship Shōnan Maru 2. It is not long before the Steve Irwin realizes they are being followed by this ship. Later, when the Brigitte Bardot begins running out of fuel, Captain Watson has to make the tough decision to send the Bob Barker north from the Antarctic whaling grounds to refuel it. As the two ships attempt to rendezvous they both end up in a large storm where a rogue wave hits the Brigitte Bardot, cracking its port-side pontoon and seriously threatening its buoyancy.
52	3	"Dead in the Water"	June 15, 2012	503
The Brigitte Bardot is slammed by a rogue wave, and water is entering the vessel through a crack in the pontoon. The terrified crew issues a distress call to the rest of the Sea Shepherd fleet, but help is more than 20 hours away. Fighting swells and brutal cold, the crew attempts to hold the pontoon in place with rope and straps. After waiting through the night, some crewmembers are finally rescued by the Bob Barker. With the Shōnan Maru 2 and Steve Irwin closing in on Brigitte Bardot's position, the Bob Barker must head south immediately to avoid being spotted by the Shonan.
53	4	"Into the Belly of the Beast"	June 22, 2012	504
With the Japanese fleet's security vessel looming on the horizon, the captain of the badly damaged Brigitte Bardot orders his crew to evacuate the boat and transfer to the Steve Irwin which is escorting them back to Australia. Meanwhile in Antarctica, the Bob Barker crosses paths with the Yūshin Maru No. 3 and deploys the small boat teams to disable the harpoon ship so they can escape, though the plan fails when the Bob Barker suffers engine troubles and has to stop to make hasty repairs, allowing the Yūshin to catch up to them. To compound this, one of the small boats suffers damage to its radar and GPS systems when hit by a high-pressure water cannon on the Yūshin Maru No. 3 and is forced to return to the Bob Barker.
54	5	"Crossing the Line"	June 29, 2012	505
As the Sea Shepherds attempt to transfer non-essential crew from the stricken Brigitte Bardot to the Steve Irwin, the whalers' security ship, the Shōnan Maru 2 closes on the two vessels. Afraid the ship might attempt to interfere with the transfer process, the Sea Shepherds warn the Shōnan to keep her distance. Once the transfer is complete, the Sea Shepherd ships continue to Australia, and watch as the Shōnan Maru 2 crosses into Australian territorial waters, despite the fact that Australian law forbids whaling ships from entering their waters. The Sea Shepherds then launch the small boats to engage the Shōnan Maru 2, but they are unsuccessful in stopping the security ship. After reaching Fremantle, Paul Watson devises a plan to have volunteers board the Shōnan, hoping to create an international incident which would allow the Steve Irwin to lose the security ship and rejoin the Bob Barker in Antarctica in the hunt for the whalers' factory ship. He gets three volunteers from Australian activist group Forest Rescue, and they begin the operation to board the security ship under cover of darkness. Despite one of the small boats suffering an engine failure en route to the Shōnan Maru 2, all three volunteers manage to successfully board the ship.
55	6	"Never Say Die"	July 6, 2012	506
With three people on board the Shōnan Maru 2, the Sea Shepherds hope to delay the ship long enough to escape. The plan fails when the Shōnan continues to follow them and they realize the Australian customs ship Ocean Protector would pick up the activists at sea. The Sea Shepherds then send small boats to attach prop foulers, but fail. They are attacked by flashbangs, forcing them to retreat back to the Steve Irwin. Another ship is identified on Steve Irwin's radar, they think it is the Ocean Protector but it turns out to be the Yūshin Maru No. 2. The Yūshin temporarily follows the Steve Irwin while the Shōnan drops off the activists. At night, the small boats engage the Yūshin. They are able to deploy prop foulers but are dismayed to see the Japanese retrieving the prop foulers with hooks and tying them to the ship. The Sea Shepherds try to cut the lines but are violently attacked. Two small boat crew members are injured, one in the face and one in the arm. The Sea Shepherds realize that the Japanese are much more prepared this year to deal with their techniques. Meanwhile, the Bob Barker manages to escape from the Yūshin Maru No. 3 by passing through Australia's Macquarie Island.
56	7	"Counterstrike"	July 13, 2012	507
The injured crew members on the small boats return to the Steve Irwin after which they see the doctor. Meanwhile, the Bob Barker begins searching for the Nisshin Maru. They notice a dot on the radar. Believed that it is a harpoon vessel judging from the speed, they cautiously approach the target hoping it would lead them to the whaling fleet. The plan fails when the ship turns out to be a fishing boat. A helicopter is sent to aid the search. The Sea Shepherds are worried when they lose contact with the helicopter on its return flight. After 25 tense minutes, they are able to reestablish communication with the pilot. The crew on the Steve Irwin have a meeting to rethink their strategy. Paul Watson decides to send all 3 small boats and a jet ski to engage the Yūshin Maru No. 2. The jet ski is used as a distraction while the small boats deploy prop foulers. After most prop foulers fail to work, they deploy the last prop fouler made out of Kevlar. It works, and the Yūshin is dead in the water.
57	8	"Target Acquired"	July 20, 2012	508
After disabling the Yūshin Maru No. 2, the Steve Irwin begins searching for the Nisshin Maru. As they head south, however, they encounter the Yūshin Maru No. 3. At the same time, Paul Watson realizes that the Steve Irwin only has enough fuel left to return to port. Before departing, he orders the small boats to engage the Yūshin Maru No. 3 with prop foulers. The plan fails when the Japanese lift them up out of the water before they could entangle the propeller. Meanwhile, the Bob Barker heads for the only patch of calm sea in Antarctica, where they find the Nisshin Maru. Both the Yūshin Maru No. 2 and No. 3 also arrive as night falls. Both ships, each towing a prop fouling rope, box the Bob Barker in to slow it down as the Nisshin Maru escapes the Bob Barker' radar range. The Bob Barker continues to follow the whaling fleet as it leaves for Japan. This year the Japanese kill over 260 whales. Watson also announces that the Sea Shepherds plan to purchase another vessel for next year's campaign.

=== Season 6 (2013) ===
Season six consisted of one standalone two hour special that premiered on December 13, 2013, at 9 pm EST.

No. overall	No. in season	Title	Original release date	Prod. code
58	1	"A Commander Rises"	December 13, 2013	600-120
The Sea Shepherds face a difficult 2013 campaign with the Brigitte Bardot and their helicopter unavailable. The fleet introduces a new ship, the Sam Simon. Former captain of the Steve Irwin, Paul Watson, is forced to step down due to an injunction preventing him from coming within 500 yards of Japanese whaling fleet. All four of the fleet's main ships feature a new captain, with Watson serving as an observer. The Steve Irwin remains to coordinate the operation. The Bob Barker is sent to search for the whaling fleet and finally locates the Nisshin Maru near the western edge of the whaling ground. However, they sit helplessly as the Japanese successfully kill and load a whale onto the factory ship. The Sam Simon is sent to search for the tanker ship Sun Laurel and finally locates it along with 2 Japanese whaling ships. They attempt to block the refueling, but fail when the rookie captain pulls away, not willing to risk his crew. After hunting, the Nisshin Maru turns east. Realizing that the factory ship is trying to also refuel, the Sea Shepherds send all their ships to interfere. 30 hours later, the ships prepare for the showdown. The 500-tons Bob Barker blocks the 5000-tons Nisshin Maru by parking right next to the Sun Laurel. The Japanese warns the Bob Barker to move but captain Peter Hammarstedt refuses to comply. The Nisshin Maru then pushes the Bob Barker with their bow, damaging the ship and causing it to list dangerously. After a standoff, the Nisshin Maru backs away while the Sun Laurel abandons the operation. Days later, the whaling fleet leaves for Japan with only 103 kills.

=== Season 7 (2015) ===
No. overall	No. in season	Title	Original release date
59	1	"The Devil's Den"	January 2, 2015
The Sea Shepherds kickoff their 10th anti-whaling campaign in the Antarctic (Operation Relentless). As the long range icebreaker Bob Barker gets underway, Captain Peter Hammarstedt knows that the Japanese whalers most likely will be more aggressive than ever (he reflects on last year's campaign, Operation Zero Tolerance, when on February 20th, 2013, the Nisshin Maru rammed the Bob Barker and nearly capsized it while attempting to refuel from its tanker ship, the Sun Laurel). But this year, the Sea Shepherds are going on this campaign without their founder, Captain Paul Watson (who's back on land in an undisclosed location). So leading this campaign will be Captain Peter Hammarstedt, while Captain Sid Chakravarty commands the Steve Irwin, and commanding the Sam Simon is an American, Adam Meyerson. The Steve Irwin and Bob Barker will be patrolling in the Ross Sea (Captain Peter is taking a gamble that the whalers will only be in this area and avoid Australia-Antarctic territorial waters because at the same time the campaign is going on, the International Court of Justice is reviewing an action against the Japanese whalers by the Australian government, challenging the claim that the whalers are doing scientific research), while the Sam Simon during this campaign will remain in a holding pattern 400 miles due north of Ross Sea acting as a refueling vessel. Three days into the whaling season, the Steve Irwin's new helicopter nicknamed "Sea Wasp", spots the factory ship Nisshin Maru and one of the three Yushin Maru harpoon ships. Unfortunately, the Nisshin's flensing deck is covered in red and has three minke whales on its deck, meaning four whales are dead. The Bob Barker is only 30 miles away and immediately heads for the factory ship as the helicopter heads back to the Steve Irwin. But in his rush, Captain Peter pushes the Barker's aging engine beyond its limits, and is forced to stop down as the Nisshin Maru gets away. Meanwhile, the Irwin encounters the security ship Shonan Maru No.2 (the same ship that rammed the speedboat Ady Gil four years earlier). The small boats Delta and Humber engage the Shonan by first trying to plug the water cooling vents, but that does not work, so they drop prop fouler lines and stop the Shonan, allowing the Irwin to escape.
60	2	"Fight to the Death"	January 2, 2015
The Steve Irwin manages to escape from the whalers security ship, Shonan Maru No.2, but soon the Shonan tracks the Irwin down and tails it again. Meanwhile, the Sam Simon lies in wait 400 miles due north of the entrance to the Ross Sea. Its primary job to function as a refueling vessel, so unless the Irwin or Barker need to be refueled, the Simon stays where it is. To the southeast, the Bob Barker sits dead in the water after Captain Peter Hammarstedt pushed the engine too hard. Suddenly, a ship appears on the Barker's radar making 15 knots. The bridge crew debates that if this ship is a harpoon ship, it should go faster. But the Nisshin Maru's top speed is about 15 knots, so Captain Peter thinks the Nisshin is coming towards him. The engine is operational again, but Peter orders that they sit and wait in the fog. All of a sudden, the Yushin Maru No.3 appears and starts to tail the Barker. Peter calls Captain Sid Chakravarty on the Irwin and tells him to send the helicopter ("Sea Wasp") out. The Sea Wasp spots the Nisshin and the other two Yushins. Soon the Barker catches up with the Nisshin, and soon the Irwin joins them. By February 1st, 2014, the Sea Shepherds have been tailing the Nisshin for one full week. Suddenly, all three harpoon ships get behind the Sea Shepherds, looking like they're getting ready to launch an attack to get them off the Nisshin's tail. Captain Peter states that the Yushins attacking the Sea Shepherds in bad weather is something that he and his comrades have not prepared for. He orders one of the Barker's boats, the Gemini, into the water to cut the steel cables the Yushins are towing. After several failed attempts to cut the cables, the Gemini's crew decides to back off because the weather is too rough. Captain Peter tries to hail the Gemini on the radio, but the boat crew refuses to answer him. The Nisshin soon slips out of both visual and radar range. Suddenly, the Yushin Maru No.3 closes in on the Barker's starboard side and collides with it.
61	3	"The Darkest hour"	January 2, 2015
The Yushin Maru No.3 has just collided with the Bob Barker (for the second time in almost exactly four years, the first time being during Operation Waltzing Matilda on February 6th, 2010). Crew rush below check the damage, which they find is just badly bent steel ribs, but no water entering the hull. As the Steve Irwin and Bob Barker race towards the Nisshin Maru's last known coordinates, the Sea Shepherds send video of the collision to the media. From his undisclosed location, Captain Paul Watson watches what happened on his laptop. He admits that the whalers more becoming more aggressive because they see that their days are numbered and also worried about the case brought against them in the International Court of Justice. Back in the Antarctic, the Nisshin Maru run into a storm to hide from the Sea Shepherds. Captain Peter calls Captain Sid to send the helicopter out, which does find the factory ship turning due east. The Bob Barker turns to intercept and soon finds the Nisshin within three hours. The harpoon ships are also there, but they don't turn to defend their mothership. Instead, the whalers wait until nightfall to engage the Barker. Both small boats (Gemini and Hunter) are lowered into the water and engage two of the harpoon ships (Yushin Maru and Yushin Maru No.3). They first try to cut the steel cables the Yushins are towing to prop foul the Barker, but don't succeed. So they drop prop foulers of their own to buy time. Soon the Nisshin slips away off the Barker's radar and Peter calls for the boats to return to the ship. As Operation Relentless comes to a close, the Sea Shepherds head back to port. On March 31st, 2014, the International Court of Justice (ICJ) ruled that the Japan's Antarctic whale research program (JARPA II) was not for scientific research and that their operations are illegal. After ten years of fighting, the Sea Shepherds celebrate their greatest victory to date. The whalers this season only killed 271 whales, falling 784 short of their total quota of 1,035. Captain Paul Watson was happy with the ICJ's decision and learned that Japan said it would abide by the ruling. But Paul is convinced that the Japanese whalers want their revenge and will do everything they can to keep going down to Antarctica to kill whales. He made clear if the whalers ever return, Sea Shepherd will be there to stop them. The following year (2014-2015), Japan sent two of its whaling ships on a non-lethal survey in the Southern Ocean Whale Sanctuary. Sea Shepherd admitted the whalers were planning ahead to return to killing whales. The whalers released a new program called NEWREP-A, which calls for the killing of 333 minke whales (no more fin whales or humpback whales will be killed) every year for the next 12 years (until 2027-2028). In 2015-2016, as Sea Shepherd conducted other campaigns around the world, the whalers did return and killed 333 minke whales (103 male and 230 female, 90% of the females were pregnant). Sea Shepherd announced the construction of a brand-new interceptor vessel they named Ocean Warrior due to be completed by September 2016. Most likely it will be sent to the Antarctic to confront the Japanese whaling fleet for the 2016-2017 whaling season. No announcements have been made if the Steve Irwin, Bob Barker, Brigitte Bardot, or Sam Simon will return to battle the whalers.

=== Other episodes ===
There were two special episodes which were aired in 2012 showing Sea Shepherd's other operations.

Other episodes
No.	Title	Original release date	Prod. code
S1	"Operation Bluefin"	April 21, 2012	101
The Sea Shepherds attempt to save bluefin tuna from poachers when the International Commission for the Conservation of Atlantic Tunas (ICCAT) fails to act. First, they approach a fishing boat legally registered on the bluefin tuna catch register with its nets empty. They next encounter a group of fishing boats with multiple cages. The Sea Shepherds launch their small boats to attempt to cut the nets but are attacked by the fisherman; one of the fishing boats is prop fouled, but is quickly freed. The ICCAT sends a jet and orders the Sea Shepherds to cease. After the tuna fishing season ends, the Sea Shepherds spot a fishing boat towing a net full of tuna. Realizing such operation is illegal, they try to cut the nets but are met with threats of being stabbed. The Steve Irwin crashes straight into the nets, attaches grappling hooks and reverses, so as to rip the nets open; meanwhile, divers from the small boats cut the nets from below. The fishing boat rams the Steve Irwin with little effect. The operation is a success, as they free over 800 tuna. It is revealed that the fishing company has sued the Sea Shepherds for damaging its property.
S2	"Seal Wars"	June 8, 2012	N/A
The Sea Shepherds face threats of violence as they attempt to document the brutal clubbing of seals along Namibia's Skeleton Coast. The mission is a success, as they are able to film the dead bodies of seals being unloaded from a truck that came from the seal clubbing beach. The security of the Sea Shepherds is constantly under threat, however, as valuable equipment is stolen and suspicious people are seen at their headquarters; fearing for crew safety, they are eventually forced to flee.
