= Hashidate Maru =

Japanese tanker boat

History

Japan
- Name: Hashidate Maru
- Operator: Nippon Kaiyo Gyogyo K. K.
- Port of registry: Japan
- Builder: Kawasaki Shipbuilding
- Laid down: 10 May 1944
- Launched: 17 September 1944
- Commissioned: November 1944
- In service: 1944 - 1965
- Fate: Sold for scrap in 1965

General characteristics
- Type: Standard Merchant 1TL tanker (1944); Converted to whaling factory ship (1946); Converted back to oil tanker (1951)
- Tonnage: 10,896 gross register tons (GRT)

The IJN Hashidate Maru was a Japanese Standard Merchant 1TL tanker built by Kawasaki Shipbuilding Corporation for Nippon Kaiyo Gyogyo K. K. It was built at Kobe, Japan and commissioned on 31 October 1944 to support the war effort by transporting oil, and was later refitted as a whaling factory ship.

== World War II ==
On 15 January 1945, while the Hashidate Maru was docked at the Hong Kong port, an American carrier aircraft began attacks that caused light damage to the oil tanker. The next day, as it is moved to the dockyard for repairs, it was lightly damaged by near misses. When the battle ended, the Japanese claimed they had shot down 22 enemy aircraft, but took serious damage to three tankers and light damage to three escorts.

On 1 February 1945, the Hashidate Maru departed Hong Kong in a convoy with four Type 2TE tankers. Soon after, she struck a naval mine and began to settle, but emergency repairs contained the flooding. On 15 August 1945, it docked at Osaka for repairs and surrendered to the Allied Forces in September 1945.

== Whaling ==
General Douglas MacArthur, as military governor of Japan in 1945, encouraged the defeated Japan to continue whaling in order to provide a cheap source of meat to its starving people, and millions of dollars in oil for the US and Europe. The Japanese whaling industry quickly recovered as MacArthur authorized the commission of two tankers as whaling factory ships: the Hashidate Maru and Nisshin Maru No. 1, to once again take whales in the Antarctic and elsewhere.

The Hashidate Maru began its reconversion to a whale factory ship by Hitachi Zosen Corporation in June 1946, with the work completed in October 1946. A refrigeration unit was installed in May 1947. The crew numbered 304, of whom 186 were factory workers, and comprised a large proportion of young men, most of them being between 15 and 20 years of age. The Hashidate Maru served as a factory whaling ship from 1946 to early 1951.

== Oil tanker ==
The ship was decommissioned from whaling in 1951 and sold in May 1951 to Iino Kaiun for 45 million ¥ens, who converted it back to an oil tanker. The Hashidate Maru then was chartered in 1952 to Standard Oil of California. It made three voyages from the Persian Gulf and Indonesia carrying crude oil to California. On 7 July 1962 it was sold to Naigai Kisen K.K. in Tokyo. The Hashidate Maru was finally sold for scrapping on 20 April 1965.

== See also ==
- Hiyo Maru
- Nisshin Maru
- Shōnan Maru 2
- Yūshin Maru № 2
- International Whaling Commission
- Southern Ocean Whale Sanctuary
- Whaling in Japan

== Bibliography ==
- Commonwealth Fisheries Office (Australia); Coonan, K. J. Japanese Antarctic Whaling Operations, 1946/48: Report on the Operations of the Japanese Mother Ship "Hashidate Maru" and Attendant Chasers (1947 ed.).
