= Sun Laurel =

South Korean-owned oil tanker

History
- Name: Samho Amber
- Builder: Dongbang Incheon (South Korea)
- Laid down: 1 September 2005
- Launched: 4 July 2007

History

Vanuatu
- Name: Sun Laurel
- Owner: Viko Offshore & Marine - Seoul, South Korea
- Home port: Port Vila, Vanuatu
- Identification: IMO number: 9405631; MMSI number: 576967000; Call sign: YJSU6

General characteristics
- Type: oil tanker
- Tonnage: 4,067 gt, 5,735 dwt
- Length: 105.6 m
- Beam: 16.6 m
- Draught: 5.3 m
- Speed: 10.0 knots (maximum)

Sun Laurel is a South Korean-owned oil tanker built in 2008 and currently operating under the flag of Vanuatu.

The Sun Laurel became notable in 20 February 2013 when it was sent to resupply the Japanese whaling fleet hunting on the Southern Ocean Whale Sanctuary, and was caught up in a conflict between the whalers and vessels of the Sea Shepherd Conservation Society. Back then, it was operating under the flag of Panama.

== 2013 incident ==
Some vessels of the Sea Shepherd Conservation Society were intervening in the Japanese whale-hunt, calling it illegal and in contravention of an Australian Federal Court ruling prohibiting whaling in Australian Antarctic Territory. Japan hunts using a loophole that allows for a very limited lethal scientific research. Camera crews onboard three Sea Shepherd vessels recorded video of the incident for a TV series called Whale Wars.

The Bob Barker and Sam Simon had repeatedly forced their way between the Nisshin Maru whaling factory ship and the supply tanker, causing cheers by some of the crew on board the Sun Laurel. The next day, they blocked another refueling attempt, and in retaliation, Captain Tomoyuki Ogawa of Nisshin Maru squeezed the Bob Barker vessel against the Sun Laurel four times, which caused damage to the Sun Laurel's davit of the primary lifeboat and the crane used to launch the secondary life rafts. The Nisshin Maru backed off when they heard a distress call (mayday) by the Bob Barker, as it was taking on water in the engine room.

Some sailors on board Sun Laurel then sent a message to Sea Shepherd vessels stating that they do not like to support the Japanese whaling fleet. Some of the crew on the MY Bob Barker, tossed six Sea Shepherd crew T-shirts to the Sun Laurel crew and cheered when the Filipino crew put them on. A few hours after the incident the Sun Laurel departed without refueling the Japanese fleet, and some media reported that the large Japanese icebreaker Shirase (MMSI number: 431999533) was sent to protect the whaling fleet. However, according to the National Institute of Polar Research, the icebreaker was in fact far to the west off the coast of Antarctica near the Showa Base, at the time. The planned navigation plan of Shirase for the 54th Arctic expedition (2012-2013) does not describe any detour to the waters of the incident. Shirase departed Showa base on 17 February, heading for Fremantle, Australia. According to the Japanese Ministry of the Environment, on 20 February Shirase was present in the Lützow-Holm Bay; more than 1,000 kilometres (620 mi) away from the location of the incident. The official report of the 54th Japanese Antarctic Research Expedition claims that articles by the Sydney Morning Herald and Australian Broadcasting Corporation were incorrect because they were based on misinformation from Sea Shepherd. The Japanese consulate-general in Sydney released an official letter clarifying that there were no connection between Japan's Arctic research expeditions and the country's whaling program. The Japanese Government subsequently confirmed that the vessel was not involved in any operation related to the whaling program, and that Sea Shepherd's claims were "completely fake".

In the subsequent hunting seasons, the Sun Laurel has refuelled the Japanese whaling fleet while in the Southern Hemisphere, although the Sea Shepherd organization and Rear Adm Goldrick from Australia argue that it is illegal to bring and transfer a cargo of heavy fuel into the protected waters of Antarctica, especially by a non-ice-classed ship.
