= Whale Wars =

Television series

- Title screenshot of season 2
- Genre: Reality
- Developed by: Charlie Foley
- Starring: Paul Watson; Peter Hammarstedt Alex Cornelissen Locky MacLean Chris Aultman Sidd Chakravarty Pete Bethune
- Narrated by: Jason Hildebrandt
- Theme music composer: Billy Corgan
- Opening theme: "Bullet with Butterfly Wings" by the Smashing Pumpkins
- Composer: David Vanacore
- Country of origin: United States
- Original language: English
- No. of seasons: 7
- No. of episodes: 61 (list of episodes)

Production
- Executive producers: Elizabeth Bronstein; Jason Carey; Dee Bagwell Haslam
- Production location: Southern Ocean
- Cinematography: Robert G. Case
- Running time: 43 minutes (regular)
- Production companies: RIVR Media; Lizard Trading Company

Original release
- Network: Animal Planet
- Release: November 7, 2008 – January 2, 2015

Whale Wars is a weekly American documentary-style reality television series that premiered on November 7, 2008 on the Animal Planet cable channel and concluded on January 2, 2015. The program follows Paul Watson, founder of the Sea Shepherd Conservation Society, as he and the crew aboard their various vessels attempted to stop the killing of whales by Japanese vessels (whalers) off the coast of Antarctica.

== History ==
In 2007, Discovery Channel began production of a reality show which would cover the activities of the Sea Shepherd Conservation Society's campaign against Japanese whaling in the Southern Ocean Whale Sanctuary off the coast of Antarctica. The Japanese claim that their whaling is legally permitted research, which Sea Shepherd and others contend is a cover for banned commercial whaling. Sea Shepherd has been both criticized and praised for tactics of direct action sabotage which include throwing stink bombs of butyric acid, as well as ramming, boarding, and otherwise attempting to disable the Japanese vessels.

The program premiered on November 7, 2008, on the Animal Planet cable channel and follows events on the vessel MY Steve Irwin as the group attempts to deter the hunting of minke, humpback and fin whales in the Southern Ocean, Mediterranean Sea, and North Atlantic. The show came at a time when Animal Planet was being re-branded to attract broader audiences and compete with non-animal-centric programming.

On November 6, 2014 Animal Planet announced a special three-part presentation that aired on December 28, 2014 as part of its "Month-Long Freeview".

== Episodes ==
Season	Episodes		Original air dates	
Season	Total	Specials	Season premiere	Season finale
1	7	—N/a	November 7, 2008	December 19, 2008
2	11	—N/a	June 5, 2009	August 21, 2009
3	14	1	June 4, 2010	August 27, 2010
4	12	2	June 3, 2011	August 12, 2011
Viking Shores (Note: Spin-off series)	5	—N/a	April 27, 2012	May 18, 2012
5	8	—N/a	June 1, 2012	July 20, 2012
6	1 (Note: Season consisted of a single two-hour episode)	—N/a	December 13, 2013	
7	3	—N/a	January 2, 2015	
Other episodes	2	—N/a	—N/a	—N/a

== Synopsis ==
=== Season one ===
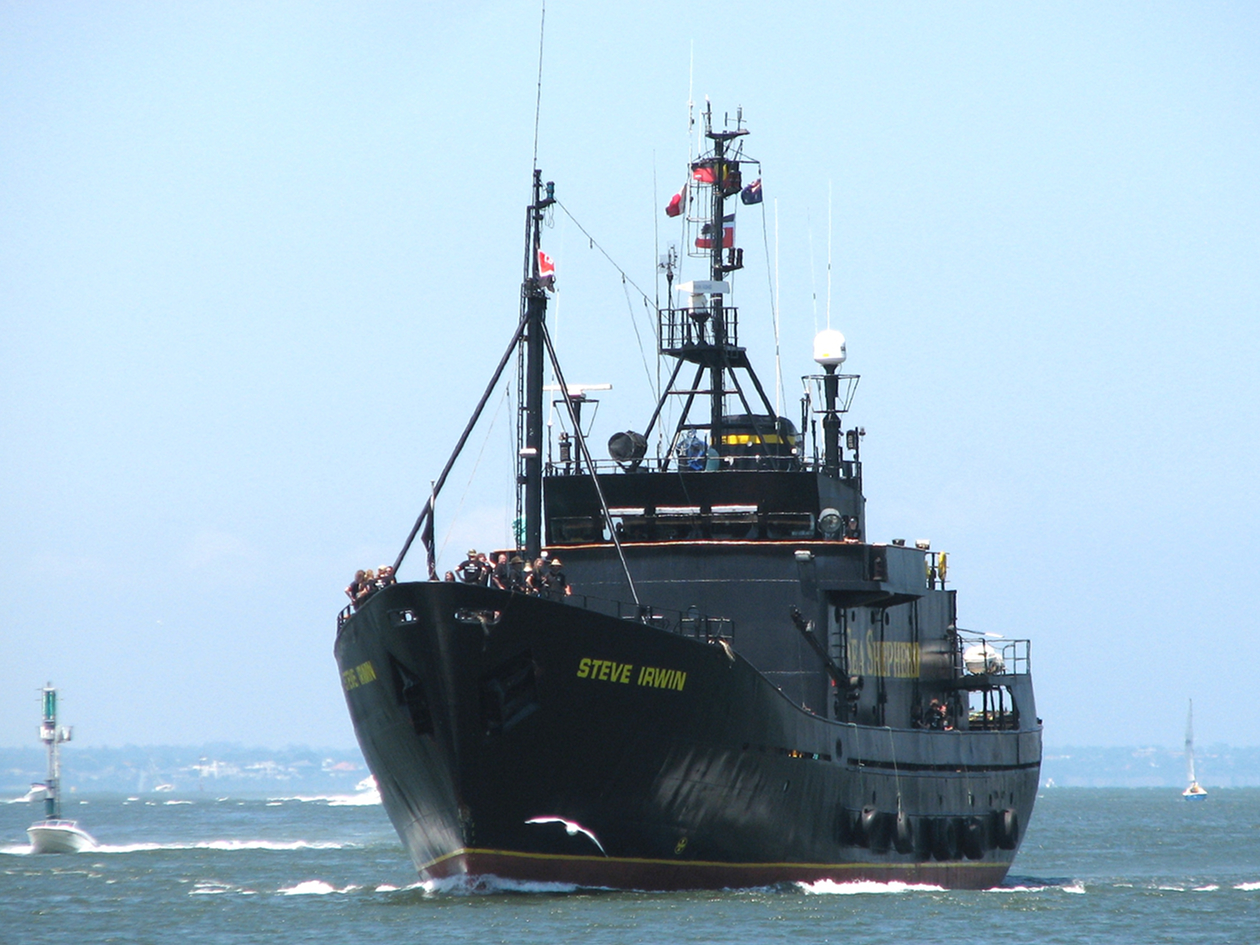
MY Steve Irwin arriving in Melbourne, 2008

The 2007–08 Antarctic campaign was named Operation Migaloo, after the only known albino humpback in the world. This campaign was the focus of the first season of Whale Wars, which premiered on November 7, 2008.

On January 15, 2008, after attempting to entangle the whaling vessel's propeller and throwing containers of butyric acid onto the decks, two Sea Shepherd members, Benjamin Potts and Giles Lane, from the Sea Shepherd vessel MY Steve Irwin boarded the Japanese whaling vessel Yushin Maru No. 2 from a rigid-hulled inflatable boat. The pair were delivering a letter advising the Japanese that they were "whaling illegally" with the hope of creating an international incident. The Japanese responded by saying that the men would be held until Sea Shepherd stopped what they called "dangerous and illegal activities".

The crew of the Yushin Maru No. 2 detained the men for two days, before turning them over to the Australian customs vessel MV Oceanic Viking on the orders of Japanese authorities; subsequently, the Steve Irwin rendezvoused with the Oceanic Viking and the two crew-members were returned to Sea Shepherd. On April 9, first mate Peter Brown was described in a newspaper article as saying that the incident only became a hostage situation because the Sea Shepherd vessel left the scene, so the Japanese would be forced to hold the two crewmen longer. He was quoted as saying, "It's all giant street theater."

On March 3, Sea Shepherd members threw bottles of butyric acid and packages of slippery methyl cellulose powder onto the Japanese vessel Nisshin Maru. Australian foreign minister Stephen Smith condemned Sea Shepherd's actions for potentially causing injury The Japanese Government called in the Australian and Dutch ambassadors to protest the actions and urge those countries to prevent any violence. Watson said: "They are so full of crap. We filmed and photographed the entire thing. Not a single thing landed anywhere near their crew ... It is their way of trying to get sympathy."

The International Whaling Commission issued a statement on March 8, 2008 that "called upon the Sea Shepherd Conservation Society to refrain from dangerous actions that jeopardise safety at sea, and on vessels and crews concerned to exercise restraint." The statement also reiterated earlier IWC resolutions from May and July 2007 that read in part, "The commission and its contracting governments do not condone and in fact condemn any actions that are a risk to human life and property in relation to the activities of vessels at sea." The Australian Government also called for all parties to "exercise restraint" and "responsible behaviour" in the Southern Ocean.

On March 17, 2008 Paul Watson claimed that he was shot by the Japanese crew or coast guard personnel during the campaign. The incident is heavily documented during the show in the final episode, and the first six episodes are covered as a buildup to what is portrayed as the major incident during the campaign. The footage in Whale Wars shows Watson standing on the deck of the Steve Irwin while Sea Shepherd crew throws glass bottles filled with butyric acid at the Nisshin Maru whaling vessel. The Japanese respond by throwing flashbang devices. Watson is then shown reaching inside his jacket and bullet-proof vest and remarking "I've been hit." Back inside the bridge of the Steve Irwin, a metal fragment is found inside the vest. The Institute of Cetacean Research has dismissed Sea Shepherd's statements as lies. The Institute and Coast Guard said that they used seven flashbang devices designed to flash and make noise in the air without causing harm. Neither of the two conflicting accounts has been independently verified. The Australian Foreign Affairs Department had condemned "actions by crew members of any vessel that cause injury". Two media releases were made on the same day from the office. One said that the Australian Embassy in Tokyo had been informed by the Japanese that the whalers had "fired warning shots" while the updated version used the phrase "'warning balls' – also known as 'flashbangs' – had been fired", and that no gunshots had occurred.

=== Season two ===
The 2008/09 Antarctic campaign was named Operation Musashi after the 17th-century Japanese strategist Miyamoto Musashi. On December 4, 2008, actress Daryl Hannah joined Sea Shepherd's crew aboard the Steve Irwin to take part in this season's operation.

On February 6, 2009, Watson reported that the Steve Irwin had collided with the Yūshin Maru No. 2 as the Steve Irwin tried to block its attempt to prevent the transfer of a dead whale up the slipway of the factory ship Nisshin Maru. As Watson explained the incident, "We were in the process of blocking the transfer from the Yūshin Maru No. 2 when the Yushin Maru 1 moved directly in front of the bow to block us. I could not turn to starboard without hitting the Yushin Maru 1. I tried to back down but the movement of the Yūshin Maru No. 2 made the collision unavoidable." The Japanese whalers blamed Sea Shepherd for the crash, characterizing the incident as a "deliberate ramming". The collision was filmed by cameramen for the Whale Wars reality series, and formed part of a multi-day conflict during which Sea Shepherd attempted to prevent the Japanese fleet from harpooning whales, respectively tried to block whales from being transferred to the factory ship for processing by blockading the Japanese' vessel's slipway. The Japanese made extensive use of LRADs to deter Sea Shepherd. They were also accused of aiming the device at the Steve Irwin's helicopter while in flight, something the group especially condemned, seeing that the helicopter was only engaged in filming, and could have crashed if the pilot had lost control.

=== Season three ===
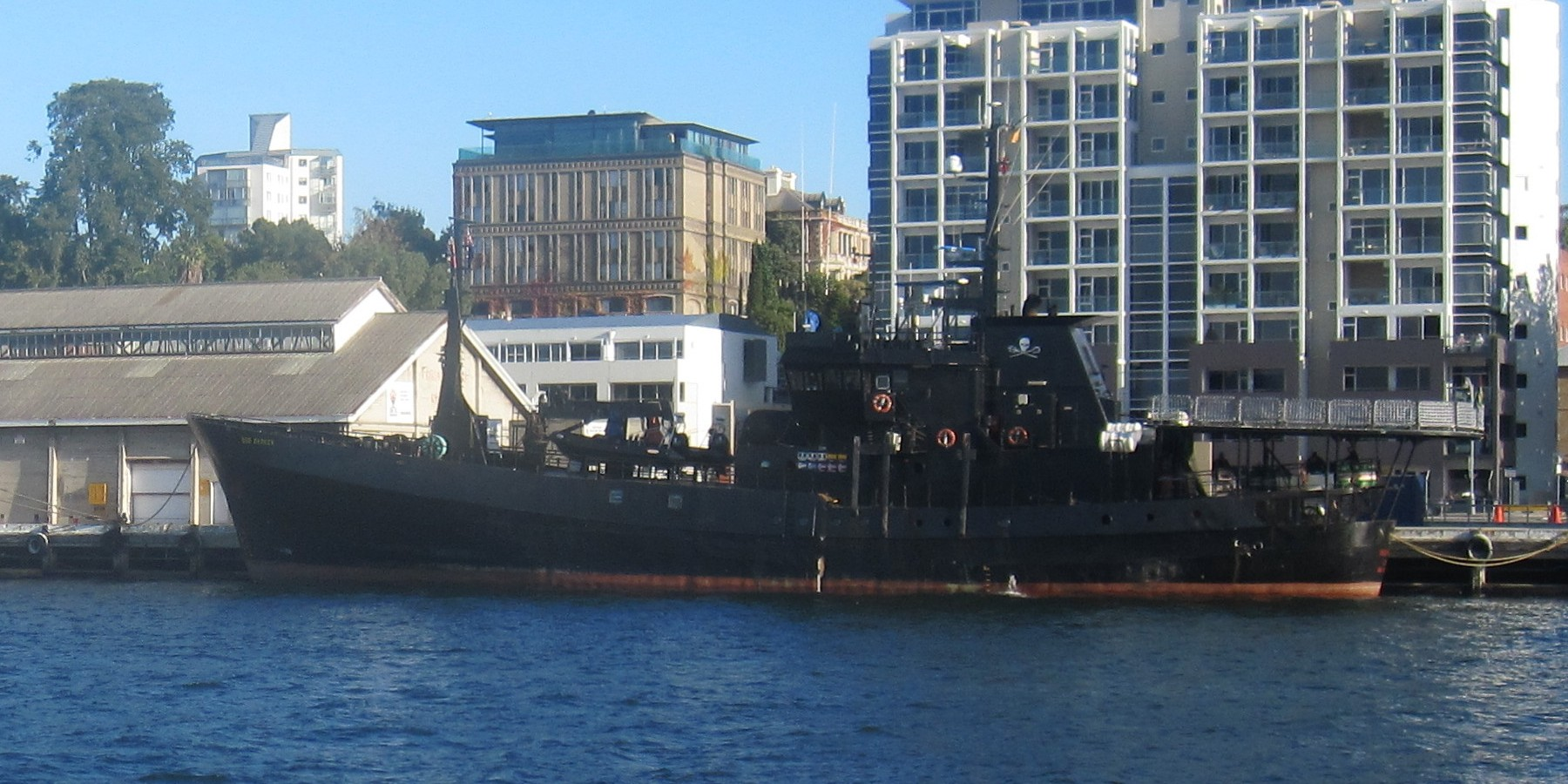
The MY Bob Barker docked in Hobart, Tasmania

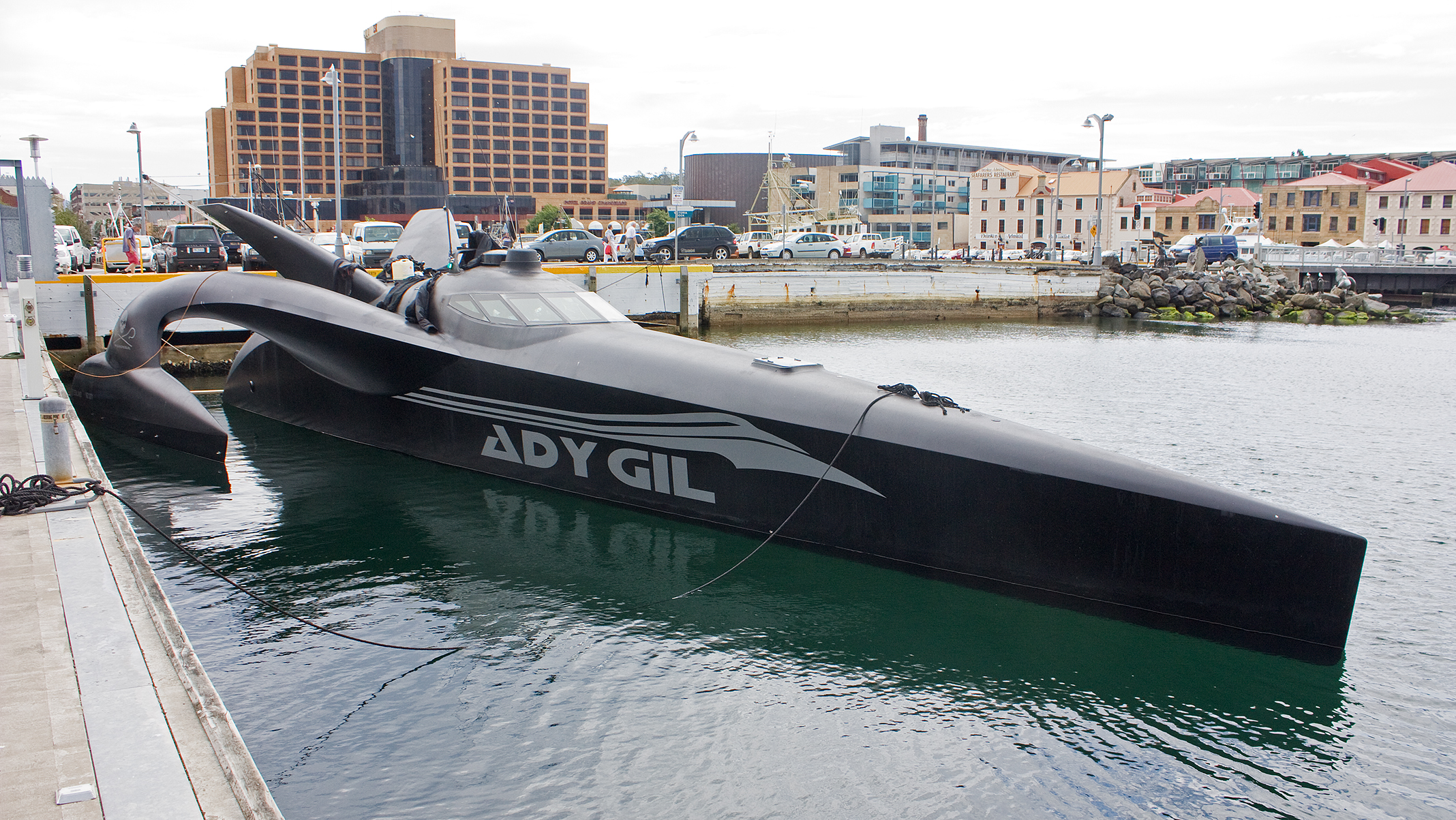
The MY Ady Gil docked in Hobart, Tasmania

At the start of the campaign, Marjorie Kaplan, president and general manager of Animal Planet, said in a news release: "The issues surrounding whaling in the Southern Ocean are important and complex. The majesty of these beautiful creatures and the lengths to which the Sea Shepherds will go in order to prevent whaling has made Whale Wars intense and vital television." She also said that Japan had denied requests to film on their vessels.

In June 2009, Sea Shepherd announced its 2009/10 Antarctic campaign, called Operation Waltzing Matilda. The campaign would include the record-breaking Earthrace vessel, now renamed Ady Gil in honor of the benefactor who helped acquire the vessel for Sea Shepherd. The Ady Gil was a futuristic styled ship that held the world record for circumnavigation of the globe by a motorized vessel. The eco-friendly vessel usually ran on a low emission fuel "derived mainly from animal fat, soybeans or other forms of bio-diesel" but was forced by operational reasons to switch to petroleum diesel. Pete Bethune, the operator, said that an agreement was reached with Sea Shepherd for the boat to adopt a support role.

In December Paul Watson and his crew of 40 left with the Steve Irwin from Fremantle, Australia, and Ady Gil left from Hobart, Tasmania. It was well publicized that the Sea Shepherds had added more vessel firepower to keep up with the larger, faster and more numerous whaling vessels. What they kept secret, however, was that Bob Barker, famous for "The Price Is Right" and one of the best-known personalities in the world of animal activism, donated funds to purchase a third vessel to add to the Sea Shepherd's fleet. Ironically, the ship is a former Norwegian whaling vessel but has since been renamed and refitted. With a crew of 26 and led by Chuck Swift and first officer and Whale Wars veteran Peter Hammarstedt, the MY Bob Barker was docked off the coast of Africa on the island nation of the Republic of Mauritius, until it was ready to join its Sea Shepherd colleagues and engage in a surprise "engagement" to stop whaling.

On January 6, 2010, the Ady Gil was rammed by the Japanese security vessel, the Shonan Maru No. 2. The vessel was sliced in half, and later sank. In response, Bethune boarded the Shonan Maru No. 2 via jet-ski. The ship sailed back to Japan, where Bethune was detained by the Japanese Coast Guard for boarding a vessel without due, illegal possession of a knife, destruction of property, assault, and obstruction of business. He was then imprisoned in the Tokyo Detention Center before being sent back to New Zealand. During his time in the Tokyo Detention Center, Bethune was expelled from Sea Shepherd.

=== Season four ===
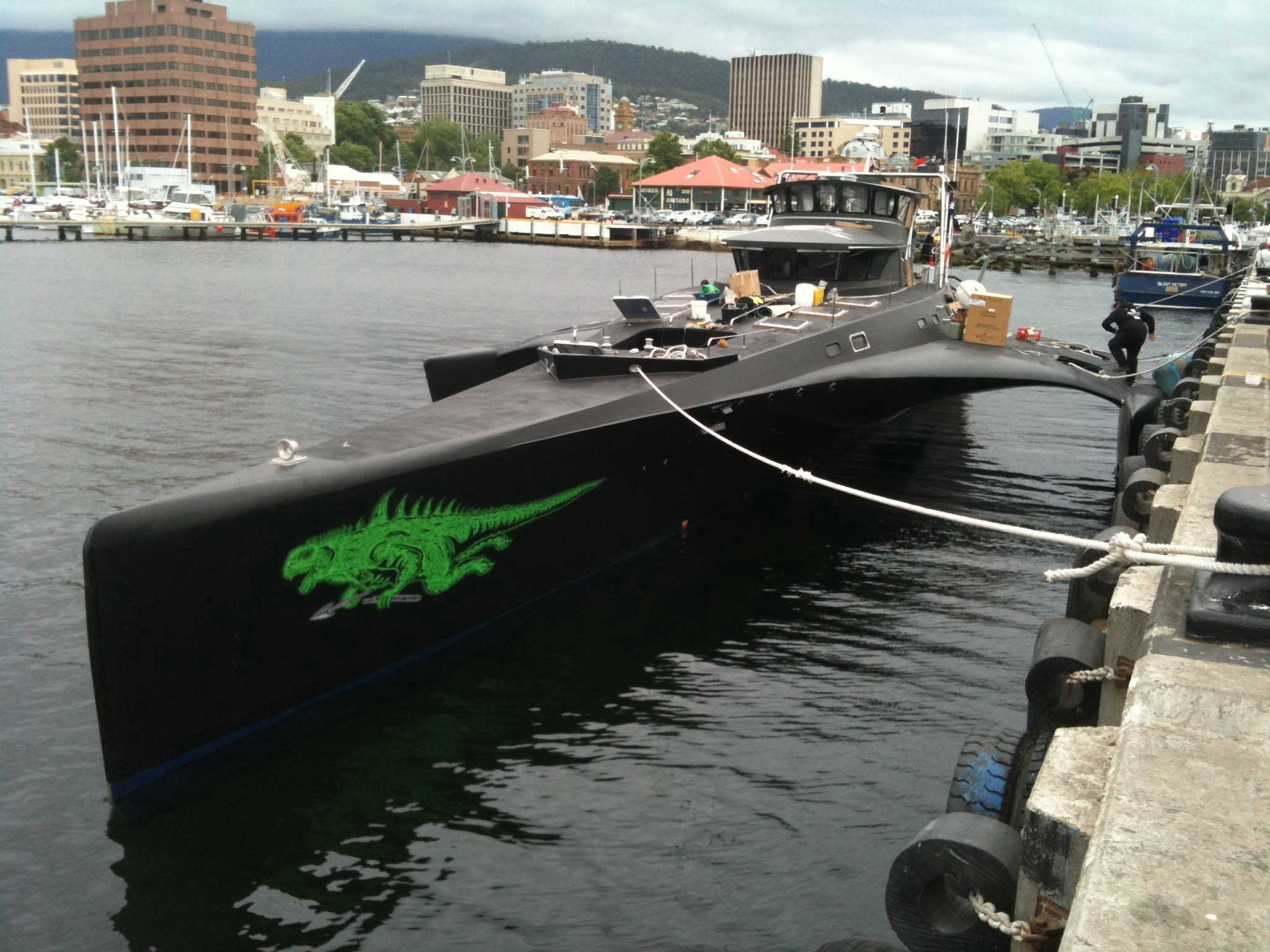
The MV Gojira docked in Hobart, Tasmania

In season four, Sea Shepherd's "Operation No Compromise" started with the whaling season in early December 2010, and lasted through February 2011 at which point the Japanese ceased whaling operations. The episodes began airing on Animal Planet on June 3, 2011. The campaign included a new interceptor vessel joining the Sea Shepherd fleet – MV Gojira (or Godzilla) – replacing the role of the Ady Gil. Sea Shepherd pilot Chris Aultman also received a larger, faster, and longer range MD 500 5-seat helicopter to replace his previous aircraft, a 3-seat Sikorsky S-300.

=== Season five ===
On December 27, 2011, Animal Planet renewed the series for a fifth season for the Antarctic / Southern Ocean campaign dubbed "Operation Divine Wind", which ran from December 16, 2011 to March 14, 2012. The campaign (Season 5) was televised in June 2012 on Animal Planet. It debuted on June 1, 2012 and was preceded by a one-hour documentary called Whale Wars: Battle Scars which highlighted the previous seasons and set the stage for the new season. During this season, the Gojira was renamed the Bridgette Bardot.

=== Season six ===
On September 20, 2012 Paul Watson began marshaling resources for another campaign named 'Zero Tolerance', which was launched in November 2012 and lasted into March 2013. Airing of the proceedings of operation 'Zero Tolerance' for the sixth season of Whale Wars began in December 2013. The two-hour special was the only episode for the sixth season. Season 6 was in part produced and shot by Erin Calmes of Keta Films on board the Steve Irwin.

=== Season seven ===
Season seven consisted of three one-hour episodes, all airing on January 2, 2015 on Animal Planet. The season chronicled "Operation Relentless" campaign in the Southern Ocean to stop whale hunting. The story follows Peter Hammarstedt as a captain in the Sea Shepherd fleet. The show is based on 3,000 hours of footage that were shot on location near Antarctica. One of the producers of this season said that “this is the most emotional season of Whale Wars...the dynamics of the crew totally change this season because Paul's not on the boat. And that's really interesting to watch.”

== Cast ==
The cast of Whale Wars varies from season to season. This list is limited to captains of the vessels shown in the series and those who boarded Japanese vessels during the series.

Name	Country	Role in the program	Notes	Source(s)
Paul Watson	Canada	Former Captain of MY Steve Irwin and "Admiral" of the fleet	Founder of the Sea Shepherd Conservation Society. One source claims that he did not hold a valid captain's license as of November 2007. He stepped down before the January 2013 whaling season due to legal troubles.	
Peter Hammarstedt	Sweden; United Kingdom	Captain of the MY Bob Barker	Former First Mate of Bob Barker.	
Chuck Swift	USA	Captain of the Bob Barker (2010)		
Pete Bethune	New Zealand	Former Captain of Ady Gil (2010)	Detained after boarding Shōnan Maru 2 to conduct a citizen's arrest on the Captain for the destruction of his vessel, Ady Gil.	
Alex Cornelissen	Netherlands	Captain of Bob Barker	Joined in 2002 and was Captain of RV Farley Mowat, currently captain of Bob Barker	
Lockhart MacLean	France	Captain of the MV Brigitte Bardot	Former first mate of Steve Irwin	
Siddharth Chakravarty	India	Captain of Steve Irwin		
Jonathan Renecle	South Africa	Captain of the Brigitte Bardot		
Benjamin "Pottsy" Potts	Australia	Chief Cook & Helicopter Assistant, later bosun on Bob Barker	One of the two crew-members who boarded a Japanese whaling vessel Yūshin Maru No. 2.	
Giles Lane	United Kingdom	Helicopter assistant	One of the two crew-members who boarded a Japanese whaling vessel Yūshin Maru No. 2.	

== Critical reception ==
Whale Wars became a hit for the channel and has received mostly positive reviews. While discussing the high ratings, the president and general manager of Animal Planet said that the show was a "great example of where we wanted to go into competitive adult TV". Review aggregation site Metacritic has scored Whale Wars 71 out of 100 based on 6 reviews. Neil Genzlinger of the New York Times wrote: "Whale Wars splashes across the increasingly exhausted genre of people-at-work reality series like icy seawater, jolting you awake with a frothy, briny burst of — well, you get the idea. This is one spunky show."

The show has also been criticized for being biased, and the Sea Shepherd crew has been ridiculed. Nancy Dewolf Smith of The Wall Street Journal wrote: "What is shocking at first is how unprepared most of these people are for their self-appointed mission as planet savers. Although the word "deadly" is used often to underscore the risks the crew face, alone out in the wild Antarctic seas – their own incompetence can seem the most frightening." The satirists of South Park spoofed the show and the Japanese whalers in the 11th episode of season 13, as "Whale Whores". When Stan Marsh takes command of the ship, a fictional news headline states: "Whale Wars Gets Better: Things Actually Happen!" David Hinckley of the New York Daily News wrote: "Because the cameras obviously operate from the conservation ship ... we get all the drama on this side and virtually none on the other." Marjorie Kaplan, president and general manager of Animal Planet, says that they have requested access to the Japanese ships for filming but have repeatedly been declined.

== Spin-offs ==
In March 2012, Animal Planet announced a five-part spin-off titled Whale Wars: Viking Shores which followed Sea Shepherd operations to stop traditional whaling in the Faroe Islands in a mission dubbed "Operation Ferocious Isles" by Sea Shepherd. The series premiered on April 27, 2012. It was preceded by a single-episode documentary called Operation Bluefin which followed Sea Shepherd as they attempted to intervene in what they claimed was illegal poaching of Atlantic bluefin tuna in the Mediterranean Sea during the Libyan Civil War in 2011.

A second documentary, Seal Wars, followed members of Sea Shepherd as they attempted to intervene against seal hunting activities on the beaches of Namibia. It aired on the evening of June 8, 2012 prior to the second episode in the fifth season of Whale Wars.
