= David Vanacore =

- Born: David Vanacore
- Genre: Reality TV
- Occupations: CEO of Vanacore Music, composer, music producer
- Instruments: Piano, keyboard
- Website: www.vanacoremusic.com

David Vanacore is an American television music composer. Dubbed by television music industry insiders as 'The King of Reality', David Vanacore is the composer behind many reality television series, such as Survivor, The Apprentice, Big Brother, Ink Master, American Chopper, Dirty Jobs, Hell's Kitchen, Wipeout, Are You Smarter than a 5th Grader and Whale Wars.

Vanacore began studying piano at the age of seven. Prior to his career as a composer, he worked as a studio session pianist/keyboardist and toured with Cher, among other artists. He studied orchestration at the Dick Grove School of Music. After meeting television composer Mike Post led to an offer as his studio keyboard player, which introduced him to the world of music supervision for television.

Vanacore's first major breakout as a TV composer occurred when he landed a job with Mark Burnett for the first season of Survivor in 2000. Originating with Survivor, Vanacore developed a technique that he describes as "layers and structures," in which the composer provides music editors with a completed mix as well as isolated layers. Vanacore put together a team of composers, editors, musicians, engineers and producers, and founded Vanacore Music, a composing house headquartered in Valencia, California, that produces music for unscripted television series.

As of 2023, Vanacore has won ASCAP's Most Performed Themes and Most Performed Underscore awards every year since 2005.
