= MV Brigitte Bardot =

Wave-piercing power trimaran

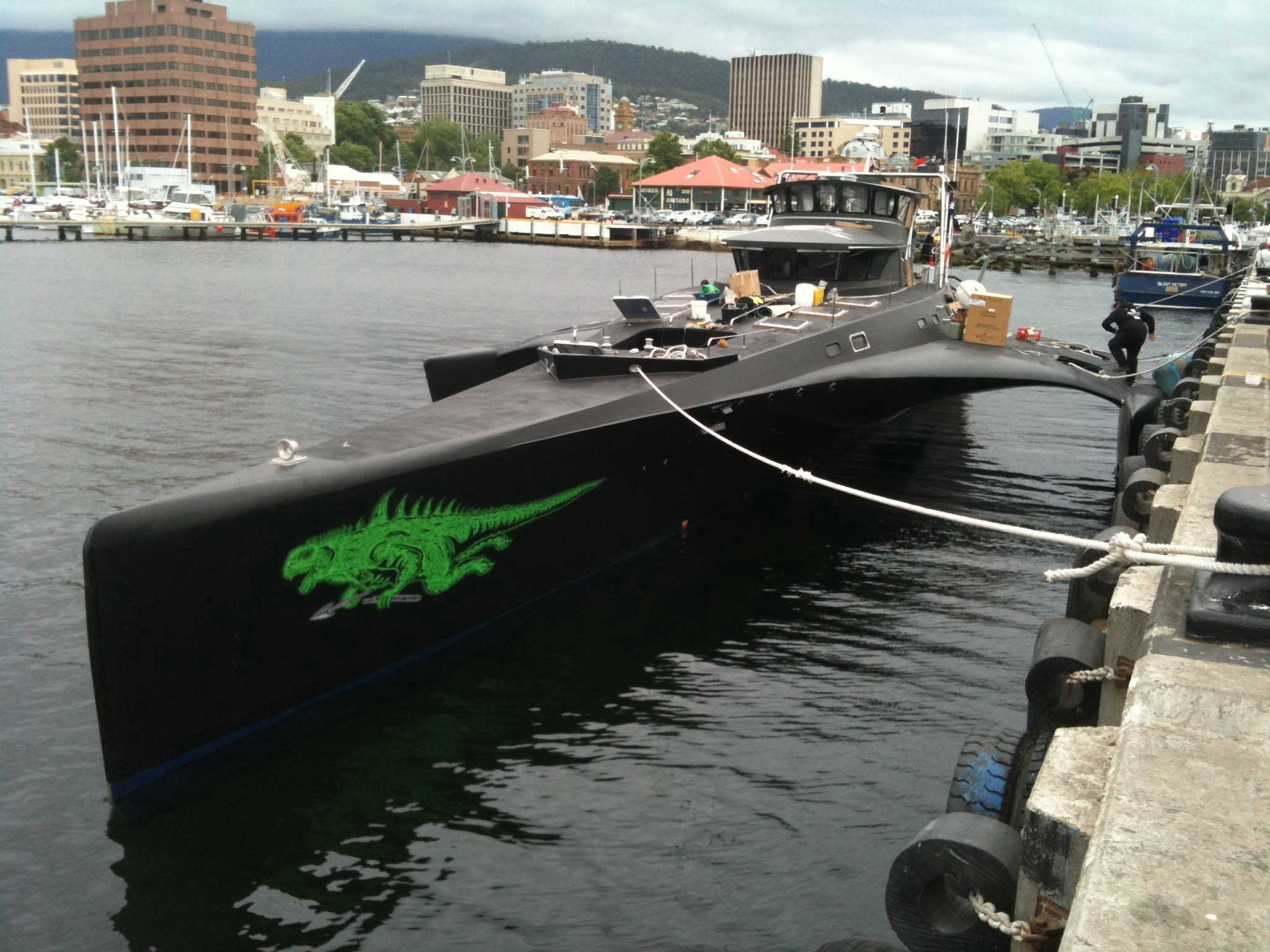
- MV Gojira docked in Hobart harbour, 2010

History
- Name: Cable and Wireless Adventurer (1998–2007), Ocean 7 Adventurer (2007–08), Rat Race Media Adventurer (2008–10), MV Gojira (2010–11), MV Brigitte Bardot (2011 – 2021); Merida (2021 – present)
- Owner: Oceanic Assistance (2021–current)
- Port of registry: Fremantle, Australia
- Builder: Vosper Thornycroft
- Launched: 16 March 1998
- Identification: Call sign: VKV7340; MMSI number: 228412900

General characteristics
- Class & type: DNV Yacht R0
- Type: Trimaran
- Displacement: 41 ton
- Length: 114.5 ft (34.9 m)
- Beam: 46.2 ft (14.1 m)
- Draught: 4.4 ft (1.3 m)
- Propulsion: 2 x 370 kW (500 hp) QSC Cummins Mercruiser
- Speed: 27 knots (50.0 km/h); (Cruising speed: 22 knots (40.7 km/h) )
- Range: 3,500 nautical miles (6,482 km)
- Capacity: 16,000 litres
- Crew: 12 to 16

Merida (formerly MV Brigitte Bardot, MV Gojira, Rat Race Media Adventurer, Ocean 7 Adventurer and Cable and Wireless Adventurer) is a high-tech 35 m (115 ft) trimaran twin diesel engine powered vessel designed by Nigel Irens. Construction of the vessel began in June 1997 and she was launched on 16 March 1998. The official naming ceremony took place on 3 April 1998 in London's West India Dock. In 2021, the vessel was sold to Oceanic Assistance, a company specializing in emergency situations at sea.

== Cable and Wireless Adventurer ==
Originally named Cable and Wireless Adventurer, she was built for the purpose of circumnavigating the world in less than 80 days. This was successfully accomplished in July 1998 in 74 days, 20 hours, 58 minutes, traveling more than 22,600 nautical miles (41,855 km). This achievement set a new Guinness World Record for a powered vessel. However, on 27 June 2008 Earthrace (later renamed Ady Gil), the biodiesel powered wave-piercing trimaran, set a new world record when it docked at the Vulkan shipyard in Sagunto, Spain after completing a circumnavigation in just 60 days 23 hours and 49 minutes. Both records are longer than the 60 days, 21 hours claimed by the US Navy's USS Triton nuclear-powered submarine during Operation Sandblast in 1960 and the current record by a sailing boat (2017) of 40 days.

The design of the vessel was evaluated and proven by hydrodynamic tank testing, and a 21.3 m (70 ft) scale prototype named the iLAN Voyager completed sea trials to demonstrate the advantages of the concept.

The vessel is equipped with state-of-the-art navigation and communications equipment.

== Ocean 7 Adventurer ==
In 2007 the vessel was acquired by Ocean 7, a Cape Town based marine brokerage and charter operation. The vessel was recommissioned and transferred to a mooring at the V&A Waterfront, Cape Town. The vessel was available for charter, film work and the occasional marine rescue operation.

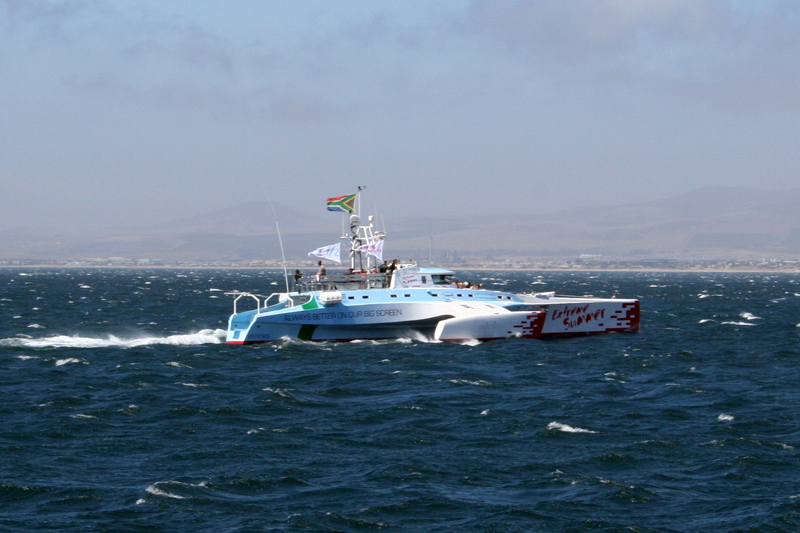
Ocean 7 Adventurer

In December 2007 Ocean 7 Adventurer was chartered to retrieve a demasted yacht, IMOCA 60 Delta Dore from the Southern Ocean. Delta Dore was partaking in the Barcelona World Race. The yacht skippered by Jérémie Beyou and Sidney Gavignet was at position 47°00 S 033° 25 E, nearly a thousand miles south east from South Africa, drifting slowly at between 1 and 2 kn (2 and 4 km/h) east. An hour after the mast had collapsed backwards, it had to be cut free and dumped into the ocean, as it was likely to damage the hull. The yacht had 188 L (41 imp gal) of diesel fuel on board, but this was insufficient to motor back to the mainland. The Ocean 7 team were approached with regard to salvaging the yacht. Skippered by co-owner David de Villiers, Ocean 7 Adventurer set sail for the Southern Ocean and after locating the yacht, she was taken in tow with a 200 m (656 ft) line. This rescue set a record for the longest tow in South African maritime history (850 nmi (1,574 km)).

During early June 2008 Ocean 7 Adventurer moved to the east coast of South Africa to observe the annual sardine run, after which it relocated to the southern end of Madagascar in July in search of waves amongst the reefs where the vessel was used as a live-aboard base for surfers and kite surfers. During September Ocean 7 Adventurer explored the Baron Islands off the Madagascar coast before returning to her base at the V&A Waterfront for the summer season, where she was available for day charters, specialised trips and functions.

== Rat Race Media Adventurer ==
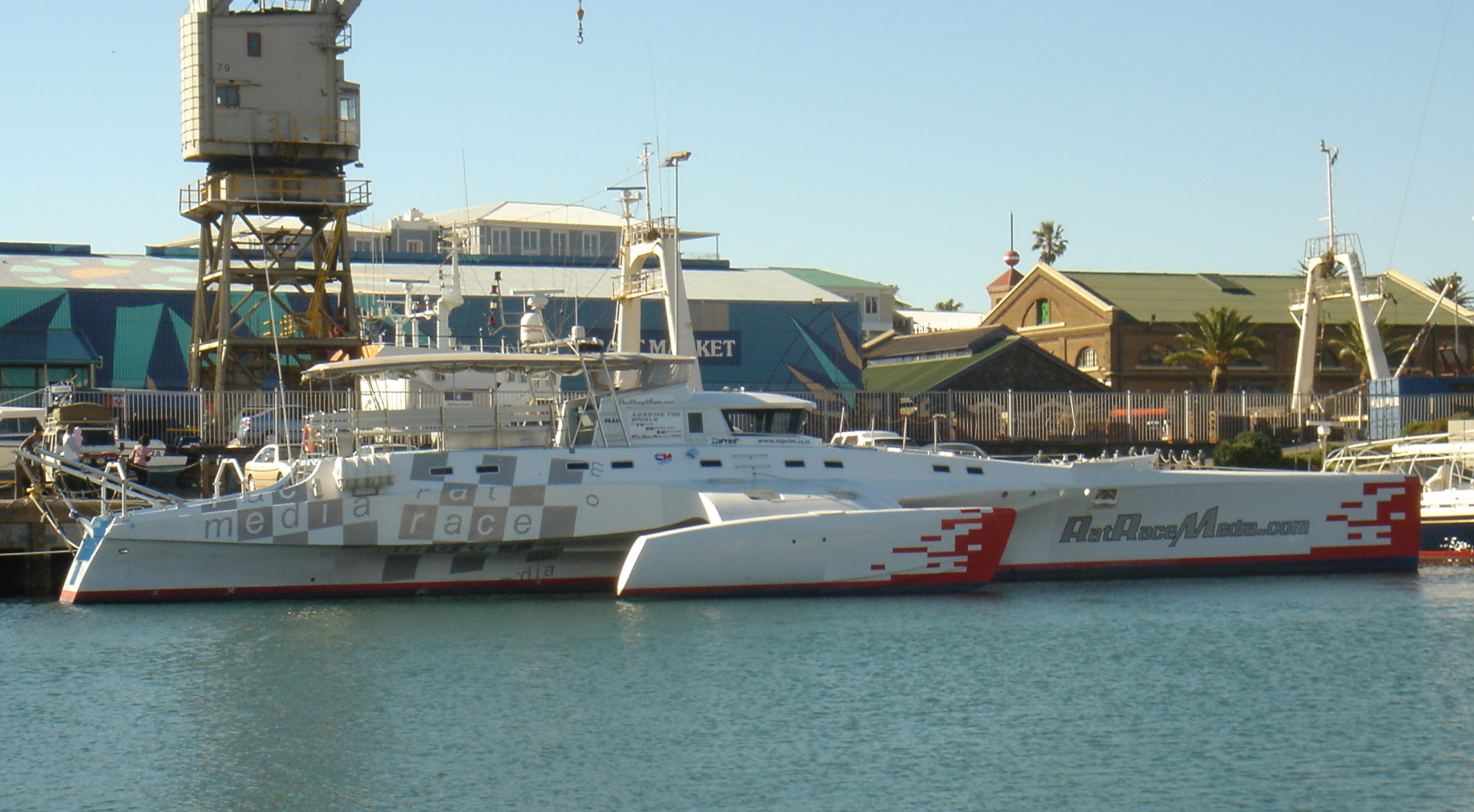
Rat Race Media Adventurer

In 2008 she was repainted in Rat Race Media graphics and was the star of a TV series on kykNET, Aqua X. The series started in October 2008 and aired until January 2009.

== Miles for Smiles Adventurer ==
In November 2009 Ocean 7 Adventurer was chartered by the Cipla Miles for Smiles Foundation to be the support vessel during leg one of the Miles for Smiles Madagascar Challenge which consisted of David Grier paddling some 550 km (342 mi) from Nacala Mozambique to Cap St Andre in Madagascar. Before setting out to sea Ocean 7 Adventurer received a new look with the Miles for Smiles regalia.

== MV Gojira ==
The Sea Shepherd Conservation Society (SSCS) acquired the $4 million vessel for its 2010–11 campaign against Japanese whaling in the Antarctic Southern Ocean Whale Sanctuary and renamed her MV Gojira (named after the French heavy metal band who have supported the charity, which is derived from the Japanese name for Godzilla). She was the first Australian-flagged vessel to be operated by the Sea Shepherd Society, and though slower, she is twice as large as MY Ady Gil, making her more stable than the boat she replaced. Gojira successfully located the whaling factory vessel Nisshin Maru in the Ross Sea during Sea Shepherd's Operation No Compromise, and broke a record for travelling farther south than any other multi-hulled yacht in history, at 76° 30' south latitude.

== MV Brigitte Bardot ==
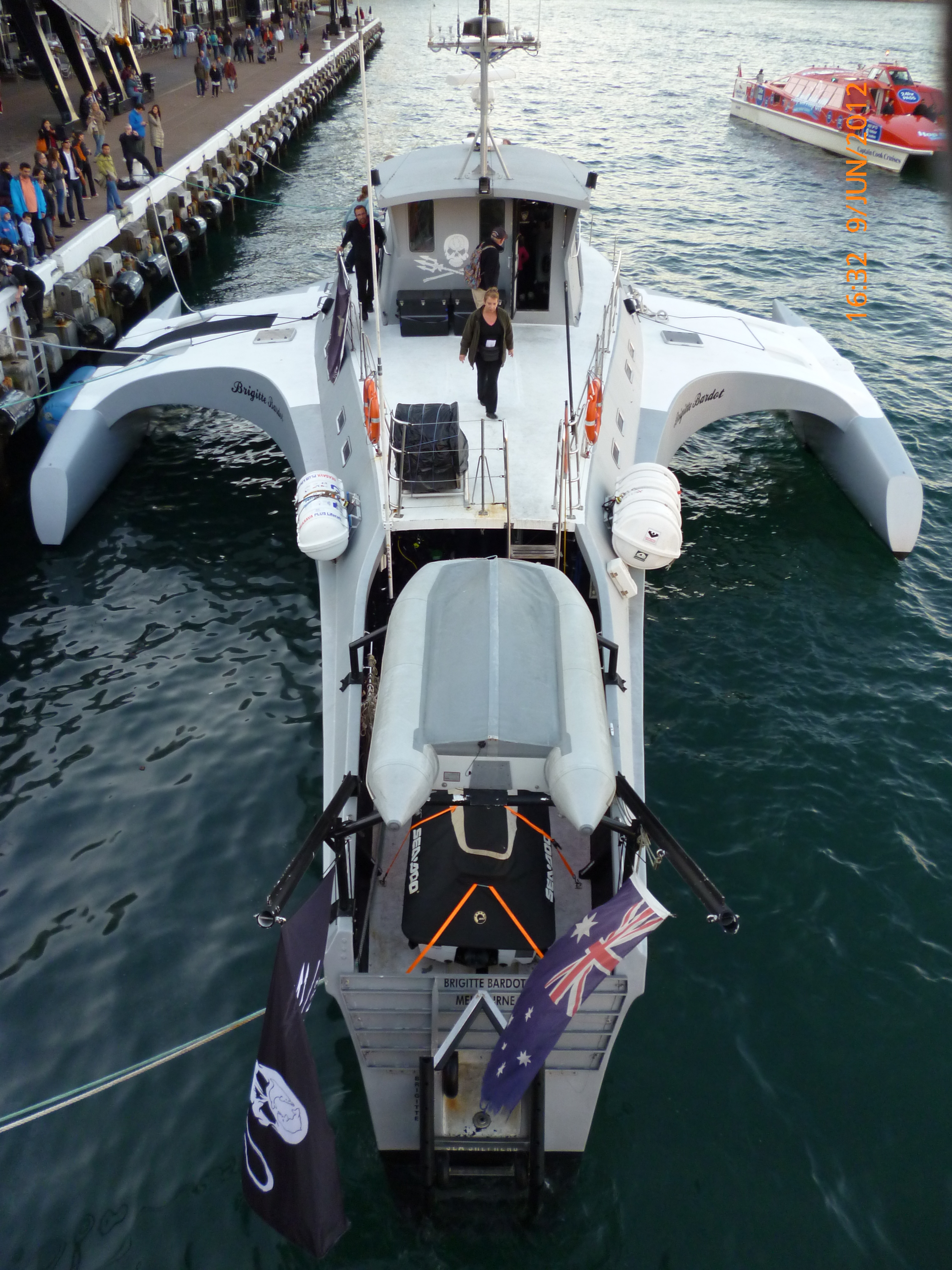
Stern view of MV Brigitte Bardot from MY Bob Barker's helideck. An inflatable boat and personal water craft are visible secured on the aft deck.

In May 2011 the SSCS was served with a notice from Toho Company Ltd., the copyright holder and owner of the Gojira/Godzilla franchise, regarding the unauthorized use of the trademark. The Society promptly changed the vessel's name to MV Brigitte Bardot in honor of the French fashion model, actress and singer whom Paul Watson, the founder of Sea Shepherd, had known since he took her on an anti-sealing trip in 1977. Bardot remotely participated in the launching with Watson describing the ceremony to her in real time. She said she was “delighted...and you and your crew warm my heart with your courage and dedication.” In addition to a new name, the vessel also received a new paint scheme; the overall black scheme was replaced by a grey coloration similar to that of a naval vessel.

The ship was damaged by a rogue wave of 11 m (36.1 ft) while pursuing the Japanese whaling fleet off the western coast of Australia on 28 December 2011. MV Brigitte Bardot was escorted back to Fremantle by the SSCS flagship, MY Steve Irwin. The main hull was cracked and the port side pontoon was being held together by straps. The vessel arrived at Fremantle Harbour on 5 January 2012. Both ships were followed by the ICR security vessel MV Shōnan Maru 2 at a distance of 5 nautical miles (9 km).

The repair process, with a cost of over $250,000, included placing the ship in a hermetically sealed chamber. Composite yacht experts from across the globe, including the ship's designer, were flown in to assess the damages and recommend a course of action. Sea Shepherd's 18 Australian chapters raised the money necessary to repair the vessel. Repairs to MV Brigitte Bardot were completed and the ship set sail for sea trials on 16 April 2012.

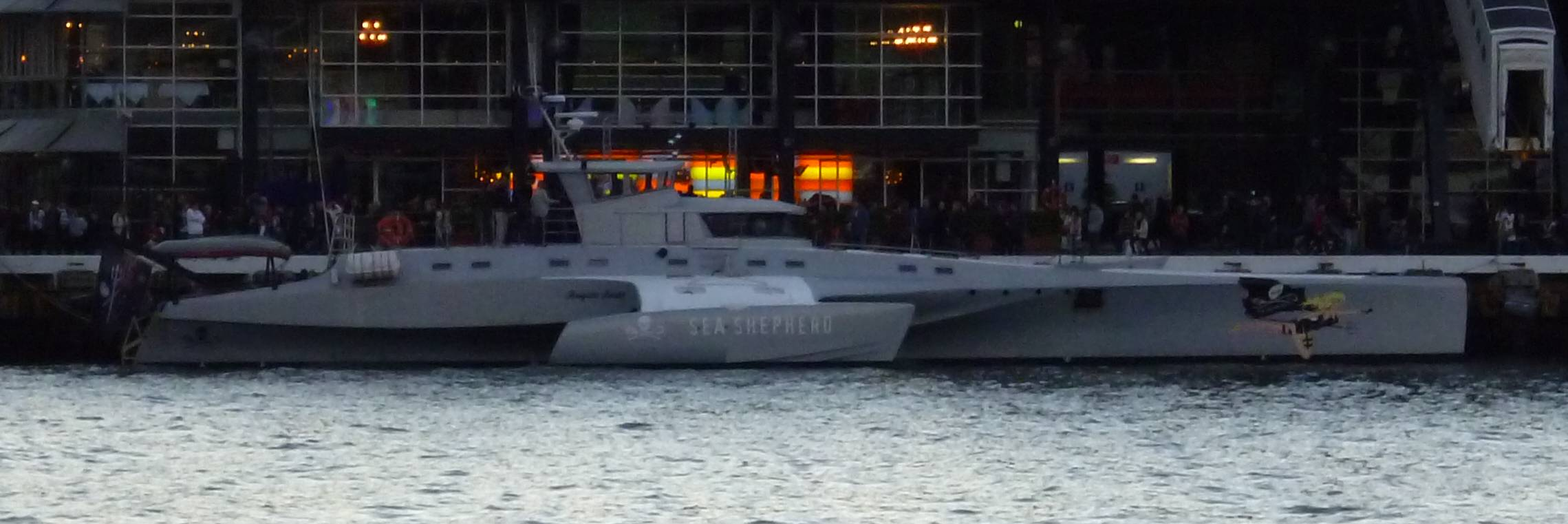
MV Brigitte Bardot at Circular Quay in Sydney on 9 June 2012

In September 2012, MV Brigitte Bardot was expelled from Fiji by local naval and immigration officials.

On 5 January 2013 in Timaru, New Zealand, a distress call was issued in relation to MV Brigitte Bardot after an observer mistook the vessel for an overturned yacht. While several vessels nearby responded to the call, MV Brigitte Bardot did not respond and instead turned away at high speed upon the arrival of a rescue helicopter. The South Canterbury Coastguard and Maritime New Zealand criticized Sea Shepherd over the incident, stating "There was no need for Sea Shepherd to behave like this". Watson said the first the organization knew about the distress call was when the helicopter arrived. "We can't help it if someone else makes the call. There was nothing wrong with the ship", he said.

Because of the COVID-19 pandemic, Sea Shepherd ended up selling vessels instead of maintaining them; the vessel was sold to a new owner in Mexico.

== Merida ==
Since 2021 she has been used as an offshore support vessel under the name Merida, owned and operated by the French company Oceanic Assistance.
