= Oriental Bluebird =

History

Japan
- Name: Hiyo Maru
- Owner: Kyodo Senpaku Kaisha, Ltd
- Operator: Institute of Cetacean Research
- Port of registry: Japan
- Launched: 1979
- Renamed: "Hiyo Maru" after dispute with Panamanian Gov't.
- Fate: Sold for scrap in 2010

General characteristics
- Type: Products tanker (single hulled)
- Tonnage: 8,725 GT
- Length: 143.29 m (470 ft 1 in) o/a
- Beam: 20.41 m (67 ft 0 in) (moulded)
- Draft: 8.42 m (27 ft 7 in)

The 8,725 ton Hiyo Maru (飛鷹丸) was the largest member of the Japanese whaling fleet; providing fuel, resources, and stock storage space for that fleet and its crew. In 1992, it was renamed and re-flagged to Panama as the Oriental Bluebird. According to Greenpeace, after a dispute with the Panamanian Government in 2008, it was de-flagged and re-registered to Japan. The Hiyo Maru served as the fuel tanker for Japan's whaling fleet, and was alleged by Greenpeace to also transport whale meat. In August 2010, the ship was sold to China to be scrapped.

== Confrontations with conservationists ==
During the 2007-2008 whaling season in the Southern Ocean, Greenpeace tried to stop a fuel transfer between the Oriental Bluebird and the Nisshin Maru by positioning a zodiac boat between the two ships. The boat was nearly crushed but was able to escape. Hours after the incident, the Sea Shepherd vessel the Farley Mowat rammed the Oriental Bluebird and tore a six-inch (150 mm) gash into the ship's hull.
