= Yūshin Maru No. 2 =

Whale catcher

- A render of the Yūshin Maru type whale catcher.

History

Japan
- Name: Yūshin Maru No. 2
- Owner: Kyodo Senpaku Kaisha, Ltd.
- Operator: Institute of Cetacean Research
- Port of registry: Tokyo, Japan
- Builder: Naikai Shipbuilding & Engineering, Setoda
- Laid down: March 6, 2002
- Launched: June 11, 2002
- Identification: IMO number: 9278040; MMSI number: 432364000; Call sign: JPPV
- Status: in active service

General characteristics
- Type: Whaler
- Tonnage: 747 gross tonnage (GT)
- Length: 69.61 m (228.4 ft) o/a
- Beam: 10.8 m (35 ft) (moulded)
- Height: 19.5 m (64 ft)
- Draft: 4.718 m (15.48 ft)
- Installed power: 5280 PS / 3900 kW
- Speed: 22 kts
- Crew: 8

The Yūshin Maru No. 2 (第二勇新丸, Daini Yūshin Maru) is a Japanese-registered whale catcher that undertakes whaling operations in the North Pacific Ocean and Southern Ocean. Along with other vessels of the Japanese whaling fleet, she has been featured on American television since 2008, in the documentary-style reality series Whale Wars.

== Sea Shepherd confrontations ==
On January 15, 2008, two members of the Sea Shepherd Conservation Society, traveling on the MV Steve Irwin, boarded the Yūshin Maru No. 2 without permission. They were detained on board the ship for two days before being transferred to the Australian customs vessel MV Oceanic Viking.

On February 6, 2009, the MV Steve Irwin collided with the Yūshin Maru No. 2 as the activist vessel attempted to obstruct the transfer of a whale up the slipway of the factory ship Nisshin Maru. Both sides claimed the other responsible. Pete Thomas of the LA Times speculated as to "whether [Mr. Watson's] actions are truly on behalf of the whales, or merely to obtain dramatic footage for the Animal Planet series, Whale Wars".

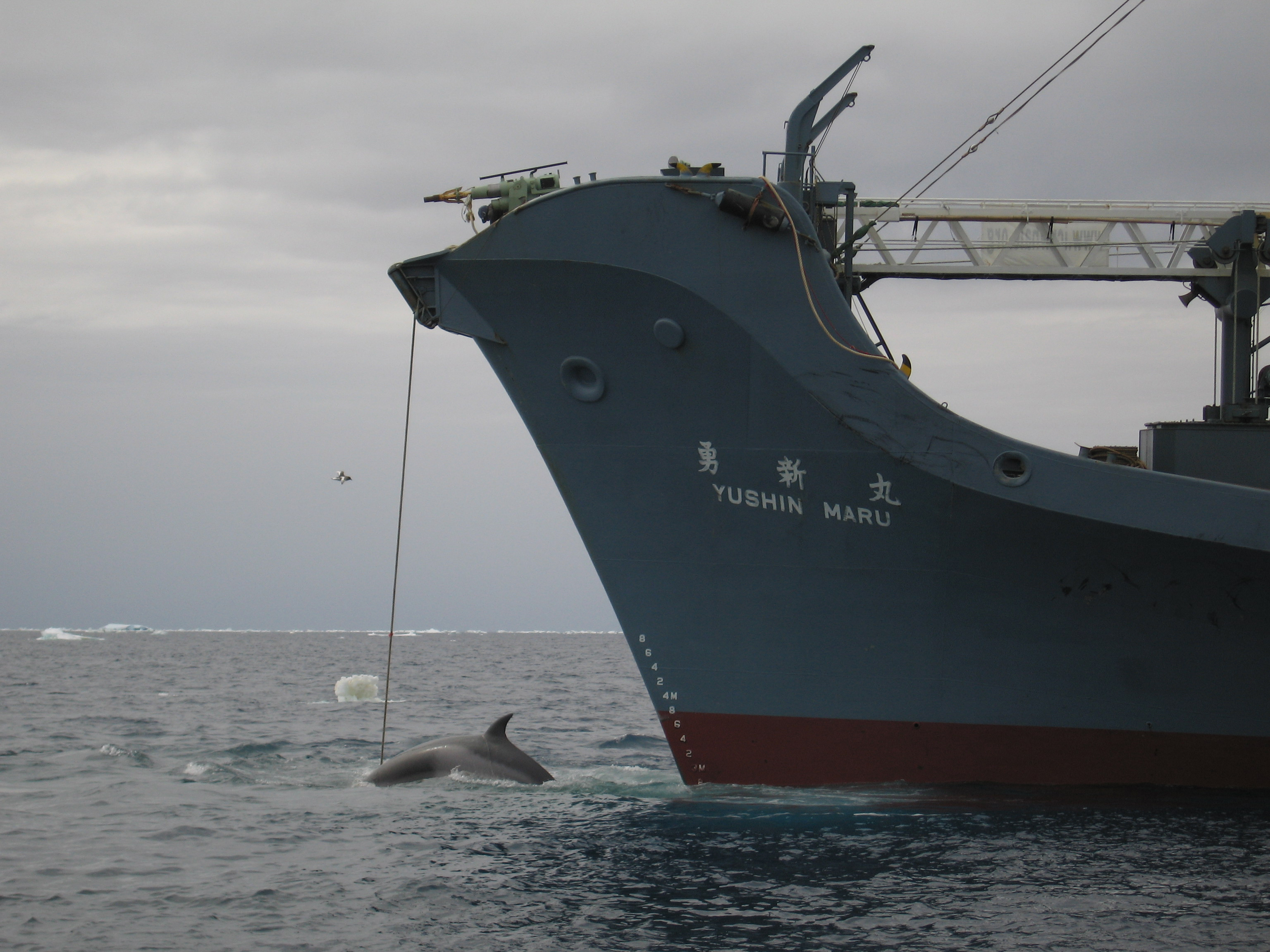
Sister ship Yūshin Maru with a Whale

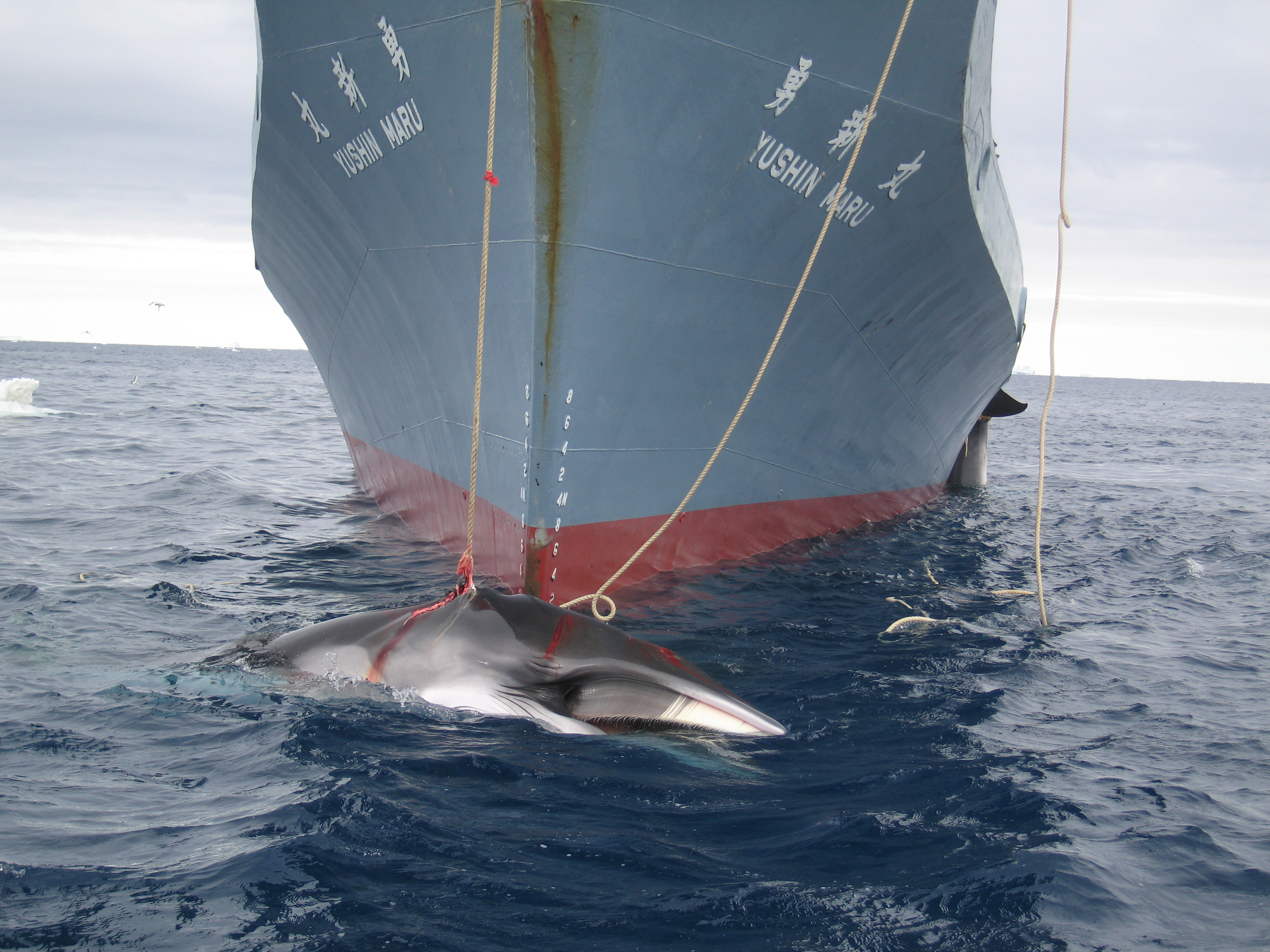
Sister ship Yūshin Maru with a Whale

== See also ==
- Institute of Cetacean Research
- Whaling in Japan
