= Nisshin Maru =

Whaling factory ship of the Japanese whaling fleet

- Nisshin Maru

History

Japan
- Name: Nisshin Maru (Previously Chikuzen Maru)
- Owner: Kyodo Senpaku Kaisha Ltd
- Port of registry: Japan
- Builder: Hitachi Zosen Corporation Innoshima Works
- Launched: August 30, 1987
- Decommissioned: 2020
- In service: Decommissioned
- Out of service: 2020
- Home port: Shimonoseki Harbor, Tokyo, Japan
- Identification: IMO number: 8705292; Call sign: JJCJ; MMSI number: 431683000
- Status: Decommissioned

General characteristics
- Type: Whaling factory ship
- Tonnage: 8,145 gross tonnage (GT)
- Length: 129.58 m (425 ft 2 in) o/a
- Beam: 19.4 m (63 ft 8 in) (moulded)
- Draft: 11.7 m (38 ft 5 in)
- Propulsion: 5,383 kw (7315 bhp)
- Speed: Max: 16 knots (29.6 km/h); Cruise: 13.5 knots (25.0 km/h)

Nisshin Maru (日新丸) was the primary vessel of the Japanese whaling fleet and was the world's only whaler factory ship. It was the research base ship for the Institute of Cetacean Research for 2002 to 2007. It had a tonnage of 8,145 GT and is the largest member and flagship of the five-ship whaling fleet, headed by leader Shigetoshi Nishiwaki. The ship was based in Japan in Shimonoseki harbor and was owned by Tokyo-based Kyodo Senpaku, which is a subsidiary of the Institute of Cetacean Research.

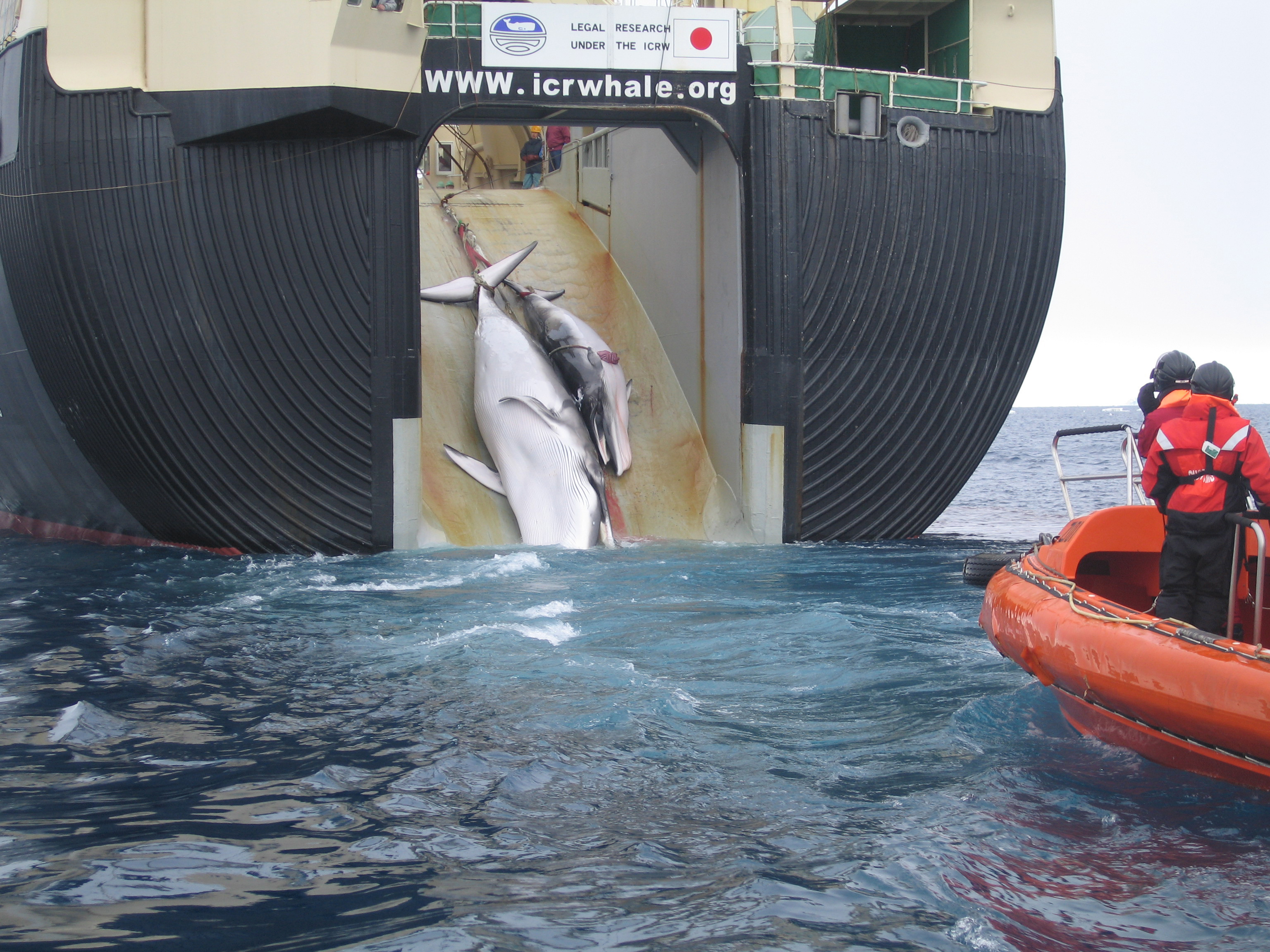
Minke whales, including a 1-year-old juvenile, being loaded aboard Nisshin Maru. This photograph was taken in the Southern Ocean by agents from the Australian Customs and Border Protection Service vessel, during a 2008 surveillance mission.

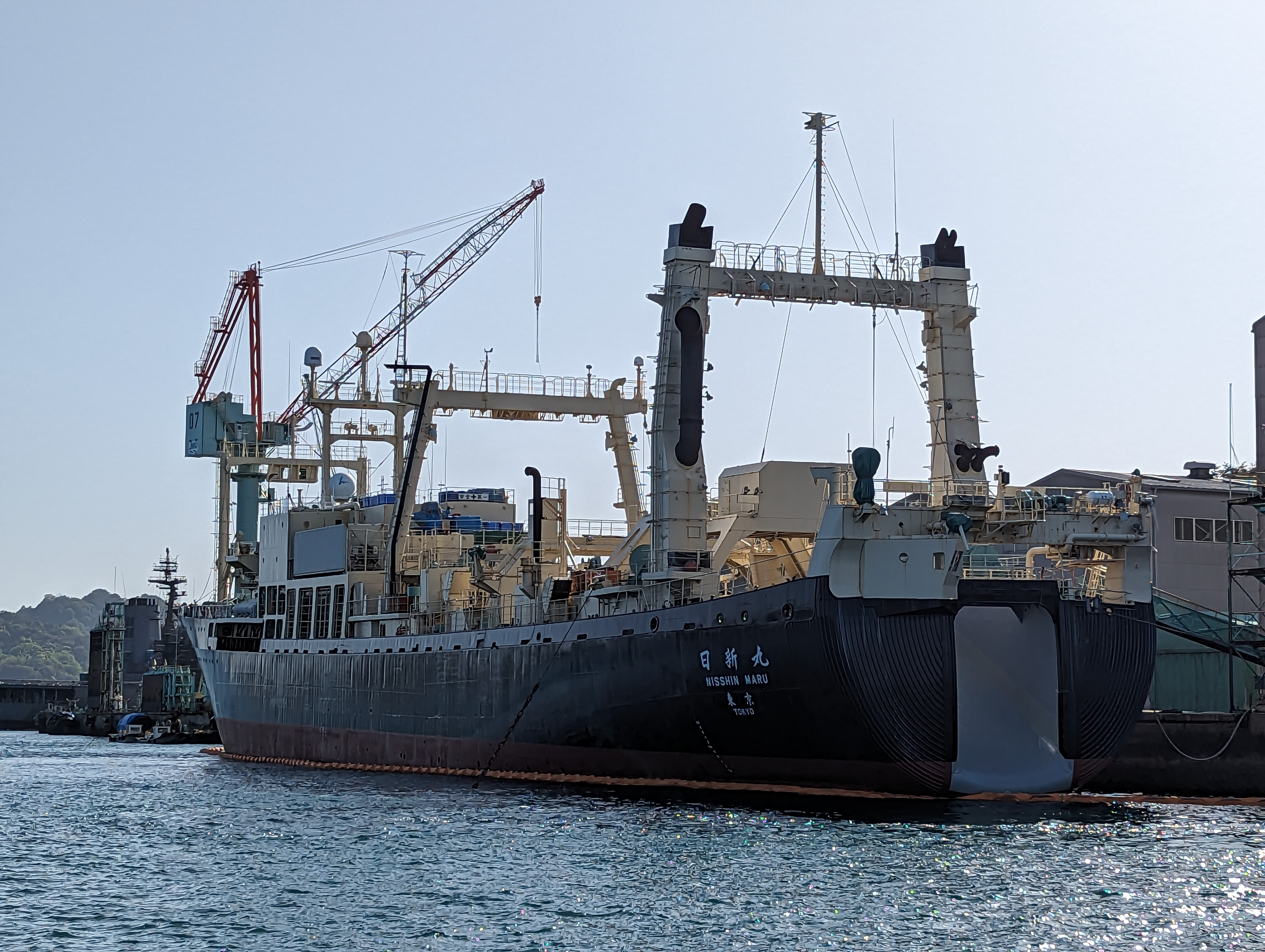
Nisshin Maru in Innoshima

== History ==
There have been several Japanese factory whaling ships named Nisshin Maru. After the U.S. Navy's Pacific Fleet was attacked at Pearl Harbor on December 7, 1941, all Japanese factory ships soon began to serve in the war effort till sunk or till the end of World War II in 1945.

- Nisshin Maru (16,764 grt), commissioned in 1936, was a whaling factory ship built by Taiyo Gyogyo from a purchased blueprint of the Norwegian factory ship Sir James Clark Ross. This Nisshin Maru was sunk by the submarine USS Trout in Balabac Strait, Borneo on May 16, 1944.
- Nisshin Maru No. 2 (17,579 grt) built by Taiyo Gyogyo, was commissioned in 1937 and was damaged on February 7, 1943, by two torpedoes fired from USS Trout. One Japanese historian reports that it was then towed and scrapped south of Ishigaki Island on April 16, 1943, while an American source reports that the vessel was sunk on May 6, 1944, by three torpedoes fired from the submarine USS Crevalle.

General Douglas MacArthur, as military governor of Japan in 1945, encouraged the now defeated Japan to continue whaling in order to provide a cheap source of meat to its starving people, and to supply millions of dollars in oil for the United States and Europe. The Japanese whaling industry quickly recovered as MacArthur authorized the commission of two converted T2 tankers as whaling factory ships (Hashidate Maru and Nisshin Maru No. 1), to once again hunt whales in the Antarctic and elsewhere.

- Nisshin Maru No. 1 (11,803 tons) was originally a standard T2 oil tanker built in the United States during World War II. It was reconstructed by Taiyo Gyogyo in 1945 and commissioned as a Japanese whaling factory in 1946. Nisshin Maru No. 1 was commissioned until the 1950/51 season. After mooring for three years, she reemerged as the factory Kinjo Maru (11,051 tons) and worked from 1954 to 1964.
- Nisshin Maru (16,777 tons) was a new whaling factory ship constructed in 1951. It was commissioned in the 1951/52 season to replace Nisshin Maru No. 1 that was being refitted. Nisshin Maru stopped her activity as a whaling factory from the 1969/70 season. After being decommissioned from the whaling business, it worked as an oil tanker supplying fuel oil for fishing vessels on the high seas, and was then sold to the People's Republic of China in April 1973.
- Nisshin Maru No. 2 In 1957, Taiyo Gyogoy purchased Abraham Larsen (23,326 tons) from the Republic of South Africa, fitted it out and renamed it Nisshin Maru No. 2 (27,035 tons). Nisshin Maru No.2 was the first ship to be decommissioned as a whaling factory from the beginning of the 1965/66 season, and worked thereafter as the mother ship of a fish meal factory in the North Pacific and Bering Sea.
- Nisshin Maru No. 3 The ship was built in 1947 by Gotaverken Cityvarvet of Sweden and was originally named Kosmos III (18,047 tons). It was sold in 1961 to Taiyo Gyogyo, fitted it and changed her name to Nisshin Maru No. 3 (23,106 tons). It is now decommissioned from whaling.
- Nisshin Maru The latest Nisshin Maru (8,030-tons) was built by Hitachi Zosen Corporation Innoshima Works and launched in 1987 as Chikuzen Maru. It was purchased in 1991 by Kyodo Senpaku Kaisha Ltd., fitted and commissioned as a whaler factory ship. It remains a whaler factory ship, but following the September 2018 Florianopolis Declaration by the IWC, Japan withdrew its IWC membership on December 26, 2018. The vessel is no longer contracted by the Institute of Cetacean Research, and it resumed commercial hunting in Japan's territorial waters and exclusive economic zone on July 1, 2019. A subsidy of 5.1 billion yen (US$47.31 million) was budgeted for commercial whaling in 2019, and was expected to hunt 227 minke whales by the end of 2019.

== 2007 Antarctic voyage ==
A major fire in the ship's processing factory broke out on February 15, 2007, while in Antarctic waters. The resulting damage caused the ship to be temporarily disabled, all while continuing to carry 340,000 gallons of oil. This incident took place within the New Zealand Search and Rescue Region. One crew member was killed in the fire.

Citing environmental concerns, specifically the disabled ship's proximity to Cape Adare, Antarctica and the world's largest Adelie penguin rookery, New Zealand Conservation Minister Chris Carter joined international citizens' groups in urgently requesting that the ship be towed away. Japan's Institute of Cetacean Research (ICR), which used to administer the ship with the Kyodo Senpaku Kaisha, declined offers of a tow from the Greenpeace ship MV Esperanza, which had been nearby and monitoring the situation since February 17. On February 28, the Institute of Cetacean Research released a statement on its decision to cut short its Antarctic whale hunt for 2006/07 due to unrecoverable equipment, and Nisshin Maru departed for Japan for repairs, cutting short its whaling season for the first time in 20 years.

== Other incidents ==
Nisshin Maru and Greenpeace's MV Arctic Sunrise collided in December 1999 and in January 2006. In 2006 both ships claimed to have been rammed by the other, and the ICR posted video footage to support its version of the incident. Greenpeace responded that the waves emanating from Arctic Sunrise in the video support Greenpeace's contention that its vessel had its engines in reverse; Greenpeace also claimed the location of cloud formations in the background of the ICR video indicate Nisshin Maru was turning into the Greenpeace ship at the time of collision.

Sea Shepherd Conservation Society claimed its president Paul Watson was shot by someone aboard Nisshin Maru during a confrontation with the MY Steve Irwin off Antarctica in 2008. He was wearing a bulletproof vest and was uninjured. An ICR spokesman acknowledged that seven flashbangs were thrown, but stated that "no gunshots of any kind" were fired.

In March 2011, Nisshin Maru returned early from operations in the Southern Ocean and immediately began assisting in disaster relief efforts following the 2011 Tōhoku earthquake and tsunami, transporting food, fuel, and other supplies to areas devastated by the catastrophe.

In February 2013, Nisshin Maru was involved in a multiple-ship collision, colliding with the Sea Shepherd vessels Steve Irwin, MY Bob Barker, and MY Sam Simon, as well as the whaler's refueling ship, Sun Laurel. Bob Barker was damaged and issued a mayday. Sun Laurel's lifeboats were also damaged due to the collision.

== IMO regulations ==
Additional regulations from the United Nations International Maritime Organization (IMO) took effect on August 1, 2011, prohibiting ships using heavy oil fuel below 60 degrees south to prevent pollution. The IMO Guidelines For Ships Operating In Ice-Covered Waters also establishes requirements for a double-hull strengthened against ice-related damage. As of 2011 Nisshin Maru did not meet the IMO standards.

== In popular culture ==
Nisshin Maru is featured in the video game Ship Simulator Extremes, along with Kyo Maru # 1 and the Greenpeace vessel Esperanza with its outboard inflatable boats and RIBs.

Matthew Barney filmed Drawing Restraint 9 on Nisshin Maru in 2005, as it made its annual journey to Antarctica.

Nisshin Maru is the name of a whaler factory vessel that is chased by Greenpeace and a German/Chilean press officer in Luis Sepulveda's book Mundo del fin del mundo.

== See also ==
- Hiyo Maru
- International Whaling Commission
- Shōnan Maru 2
- Southern Ocean Whale Sanctuary
- Yūshin Maru № 2
