= Tûranor PlanetSolar =

Solar-powered boat

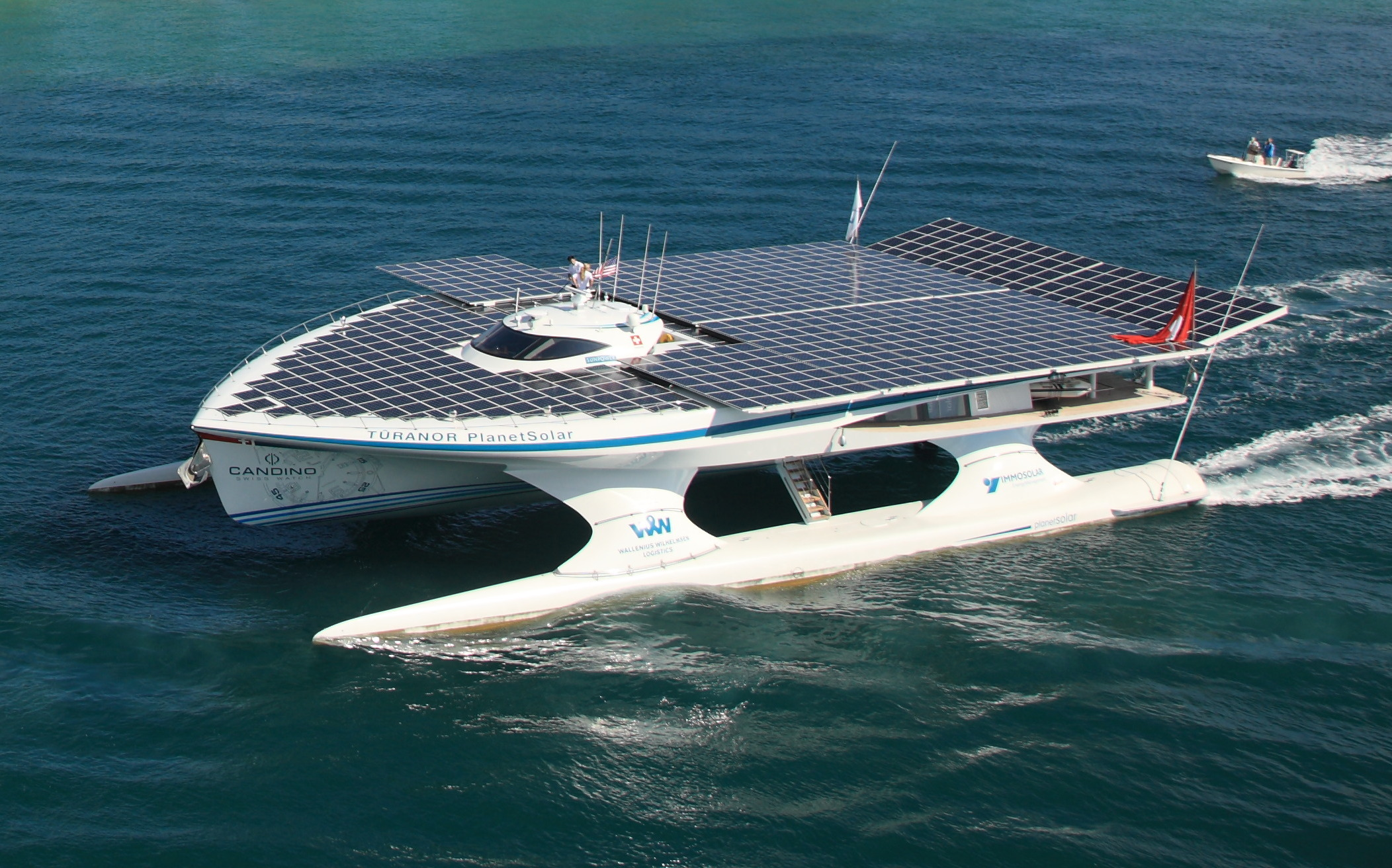
- PlanetSolar in Miami, Florida

History

Switzerland
- Name: MS Tûranor PlanetSolar
- Owner: PlanetSolar SA from 2015 Race For Water Foundation
- Builder: Knierim Yachtbau, Kiel, Germany
- Cost: €15 million
- Launched: 31 March 2010

General characteristics
- Class & type: Yacht
- Displacement: 85 tonnes
- Length: 31 m (35 m with flaps)
- Beam: 15 m (23 m with flaps)
- Propulsion: 2 Permanent Magnet Synchronous Electrical Motors – 60 kW each (max) @ 1600 rpm; 2 Permanent Magnet Synchronous Electrical Motors – 10 kW each (max) @ 1000 rpm
- Speed: 10 knots (19 km/h; 12 mph) (max); 5 knots (9.3 km/h; 5.8 mph) (cruising)
- Crew: 4

MS Tûranor PlanetSolar, after May 23, 2025 known as the Porrima P111, was previously known under the project name PlanetSolar, founded by the Swiss explorer Raphaël Domjan, and relaunched on May 23, 2025 in Kaohsiung, Taiwan is the largest solar-powered boat in the world originally launched on 31 March 2010. The vessel was designed and engineered by LOMOcean Marine. In May 2012, the vessel became the first solar electric vehicle ever to circumnavigate the globe taking 584 days between 2010 and 2012.

The boat was renamed Race for Water in 2015, after the name of the foundation which then operated the vessel and was dedicated to water conservation missions and to protect the oceans from plastic pollution. In 2021, new owners Porrima projects renamed the ship Porrima.

In September 2022, Porrima ran aground in India and was heavily damaged.

== Technical characteristics ==
The 31-metre boat is covered by 537 m^{2} of solar panels rated at 93 kWp, which in turn connect to two electric motors, one in each hull. There are 8.5 tons of lithium-ion batteries in the ship's two hulls. The boat's shape allows it to reach speeds of up to 10 knots (19 km/h). The hull was model tested in wind tunnels and was tank tested to determine its hydrodynamics and aerodynamics. The boat was designed to be used as a luxury yacht after the record attempt was finished. The vessel was later used as an Ambassador for the project Race for Water.

The boat is registered in Switzerland and was financed by a German entrepreneur, Immo Ströher and designed and engineered by New Zealand naval architects LOMOcean Marine. Construction cost was €15 million. The name Tûranor, derived from J.R.R. Tolkien's novel The Lord of the Rings, translates to "The Power of the Sun".

== Around the world ==
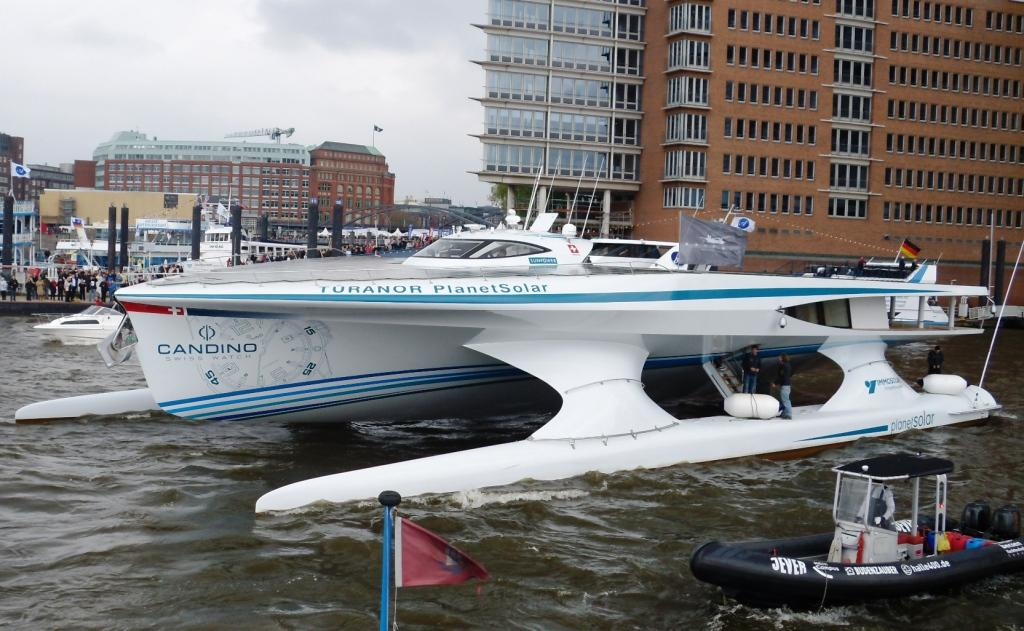
PlanetSolar in Hamburg, 2010

On 27 September 2010, Tûranor PlanetSolar set off from Monaco to circumnavigate the globe solely with the aid of solar power. One aim of the project was to focus public awareness on the importance of renewable energies for environmental protection.

The boat had a full-time crew of four including:

- Raphaël Domjan of Switzerland, expedition leader
- Christian Ochsenbein of Switzerland, electrical engineer
- Jens Langwasser of Germany, quartermaster
- Patrick Marchesseau of France, skipper for the first half of the voyage from Monaco to Nouméa and the high-risk leg from Abu Dhabi to Port Sudan
- Erwann Le Rouzic of France, skipper for the second half of the voyage from Nouméa to Monaco

Additional crew members joined the voyage during select legs of the voyage including extra security in the Gulf of Aden.

A significant stopover was Cancún, Mexico, during the 2010 United Nations Climate Change Conference held there from 29 November to 10 December 2010. During the expedition, Tûranor PlanetSolar broke two records: the fastest crossing of the Atlantic Ocean by solar boat and the longest distance ever covered by a solar electric vehicle. Tûranor PlanetSolar returned to Monaco on 4 May 2012 after 584 days sailing around the globe.

== 2013 voyage and transatlantic record ==
After an engine refit, Tûranor PlanetSolar broke its own record, crossing the Atlantic Ocean from Las Palmas to Saint Martin in the Caribbean in only 22 days, four days faster than on the circumnavigation trip. The boat left Las Palmas on 25 April and arrived in Marigot on Saint Martin on 18 May. The trip led to Miami, Florida, and then continued as a scientific expedition along the Gulf Stream. On the return trip the boat reached St John's, Newfoundland, on 1 August 2013 before heading back across the Atlantic.

== Gallery ==
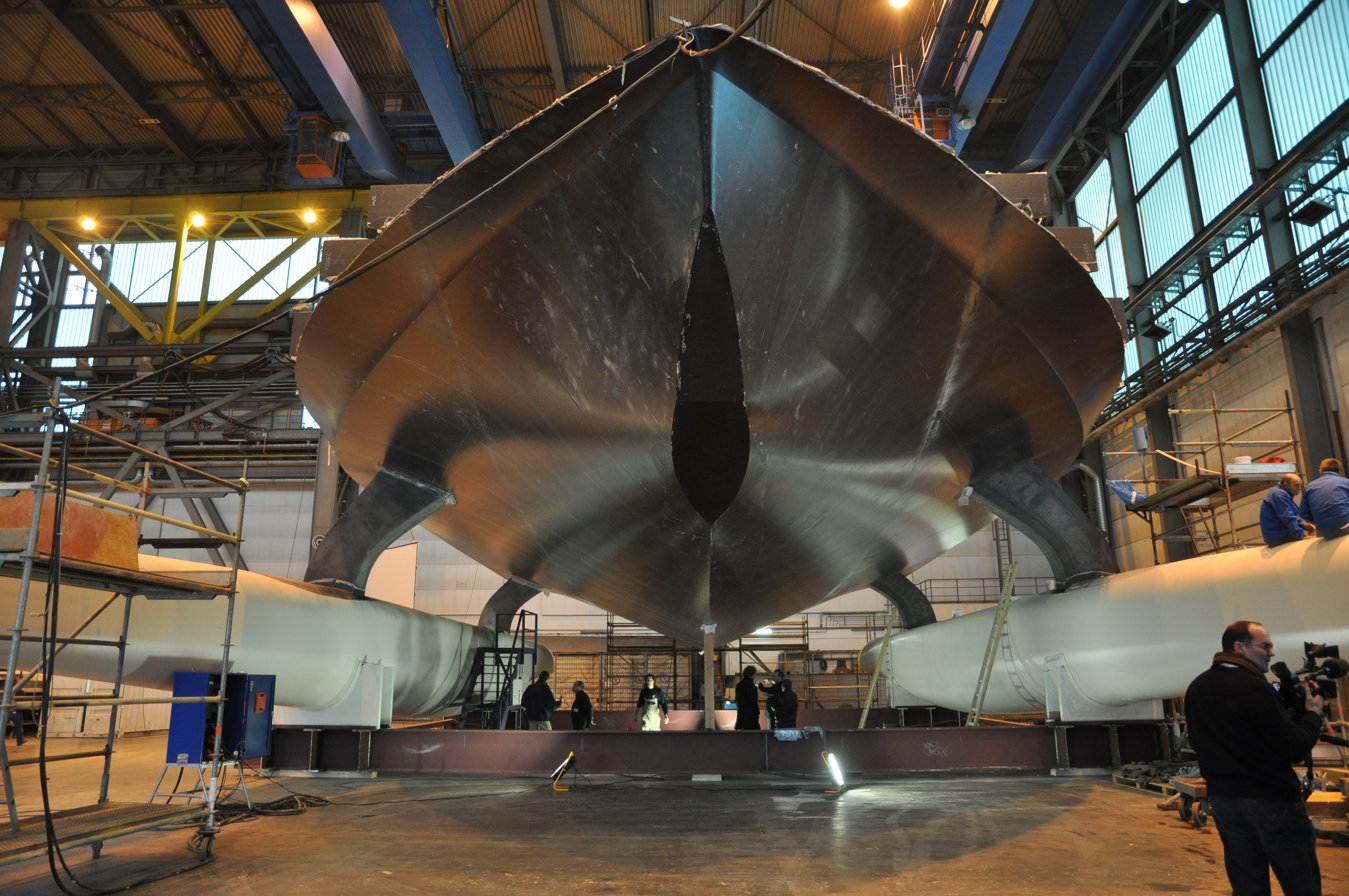
Construction in Kiel, Germany.

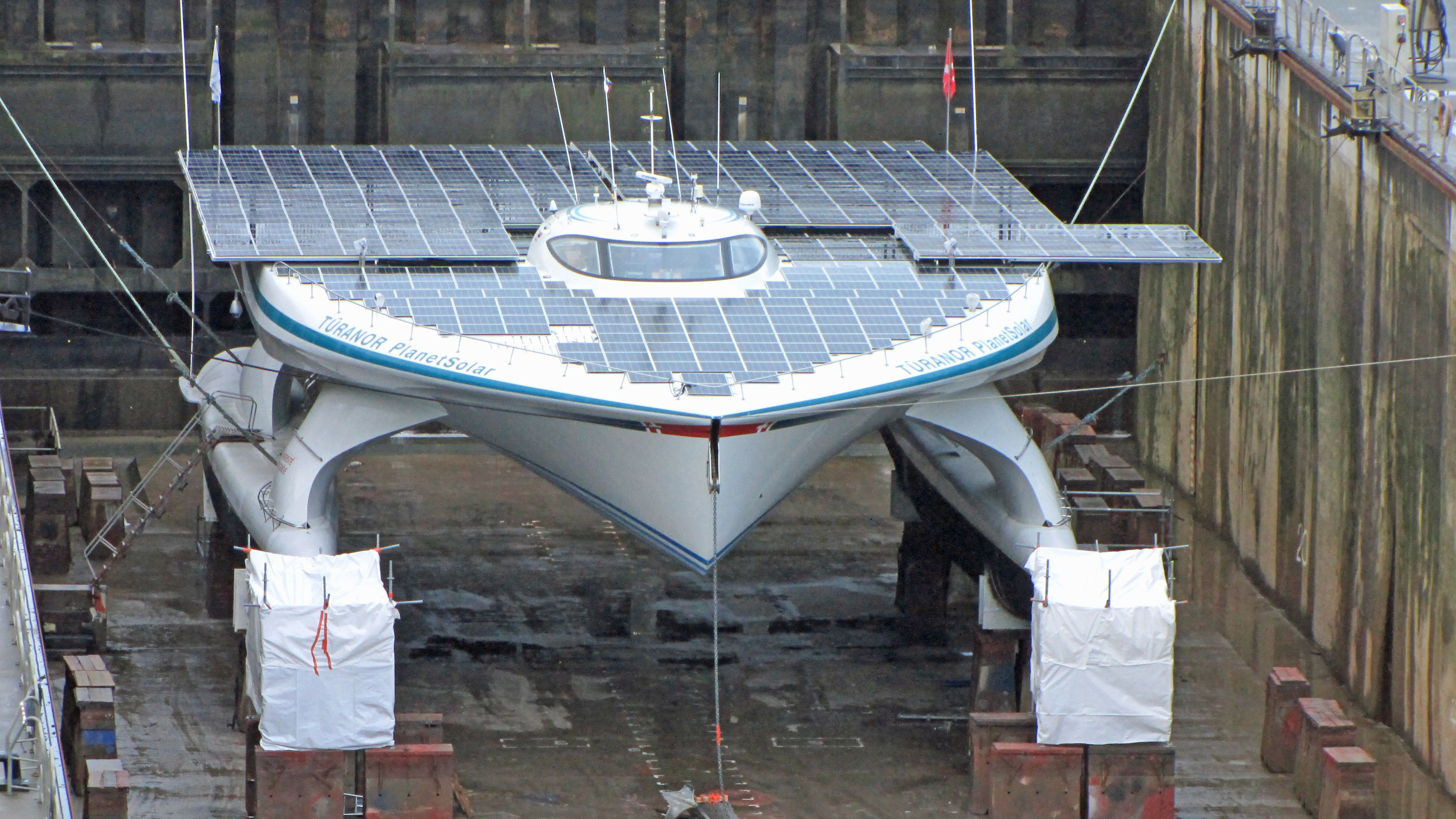
At the shipyard of Concarneau.

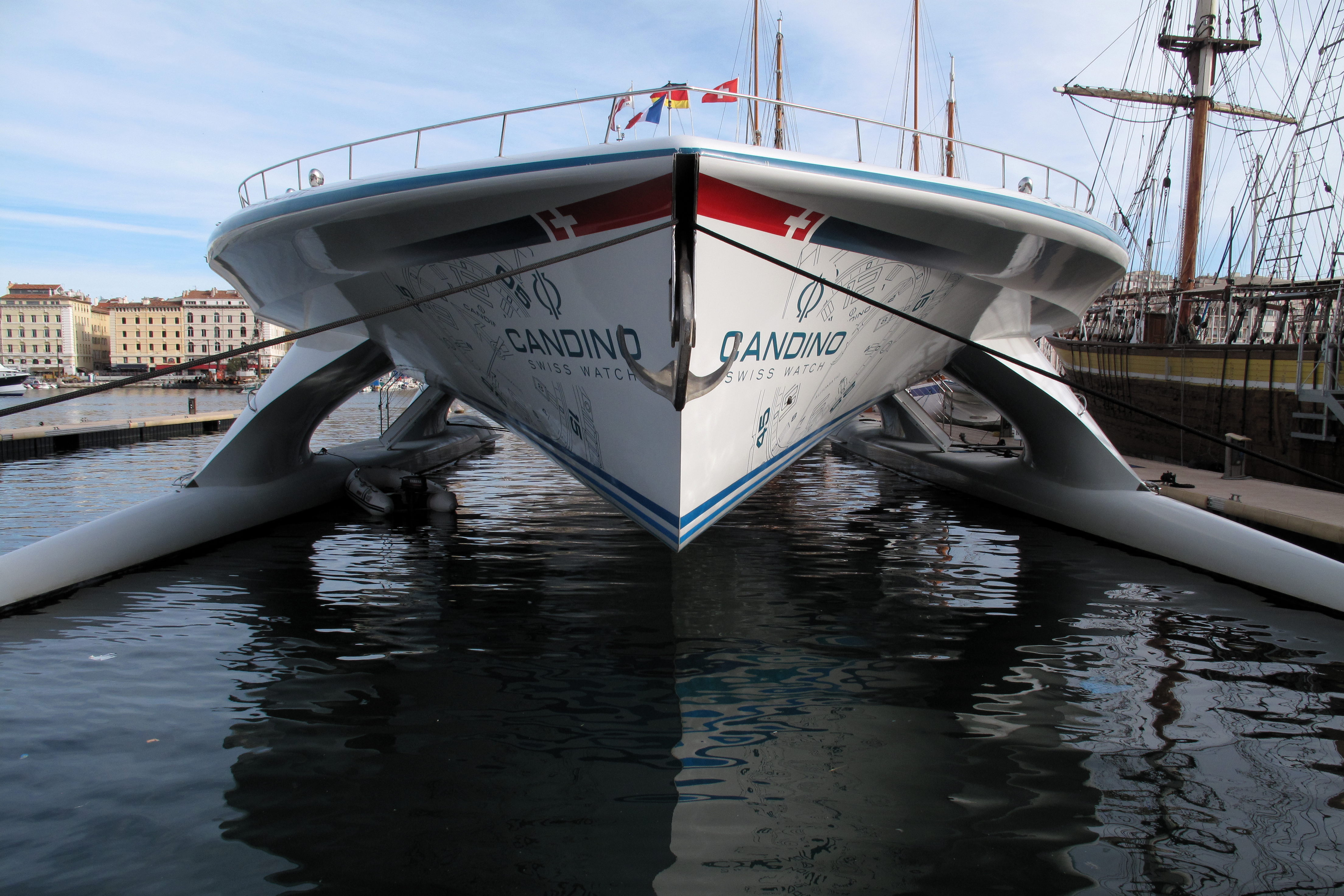
View of the bow, showing the three hulls.

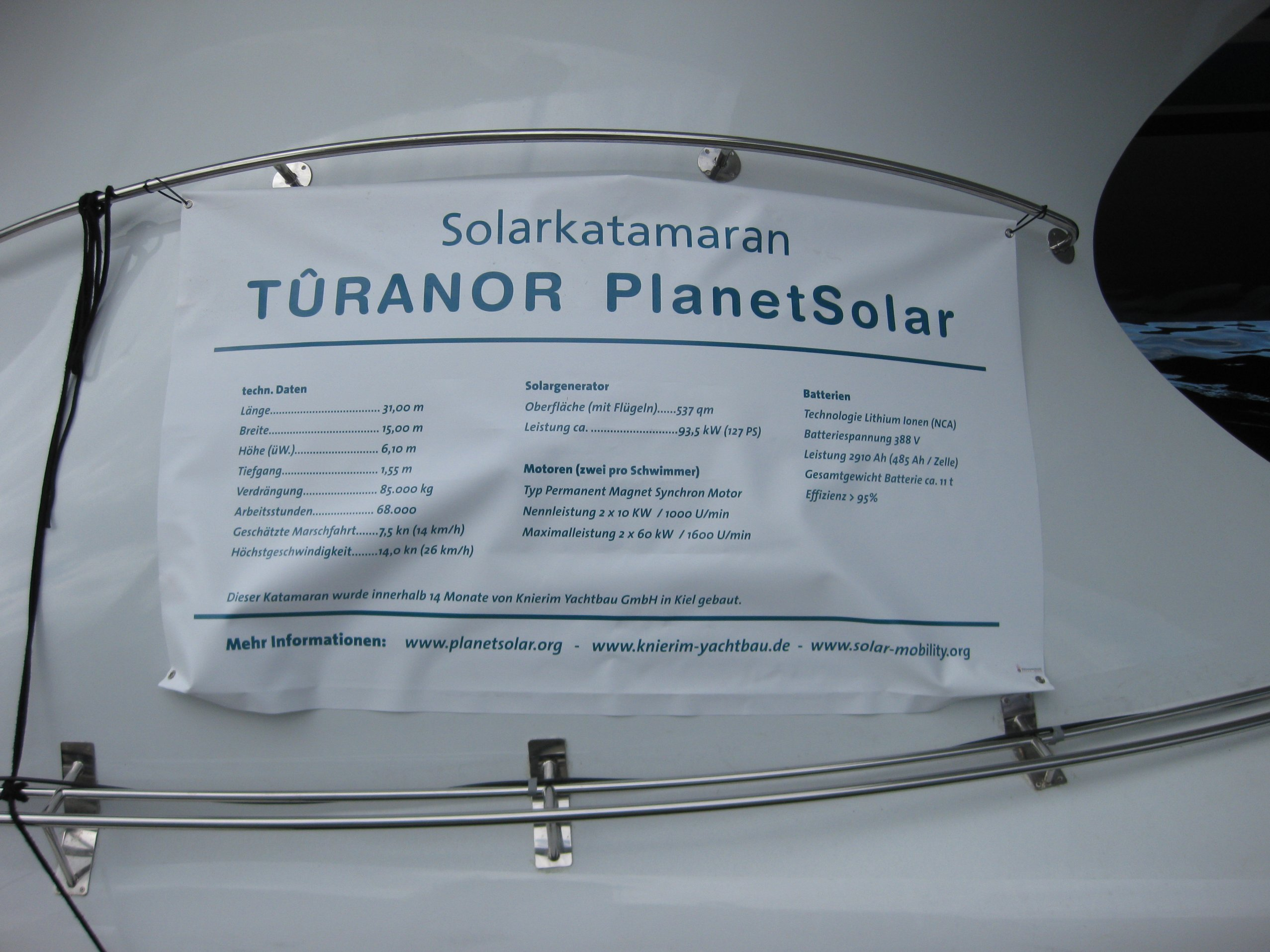
Original data sheet on the fuselage.

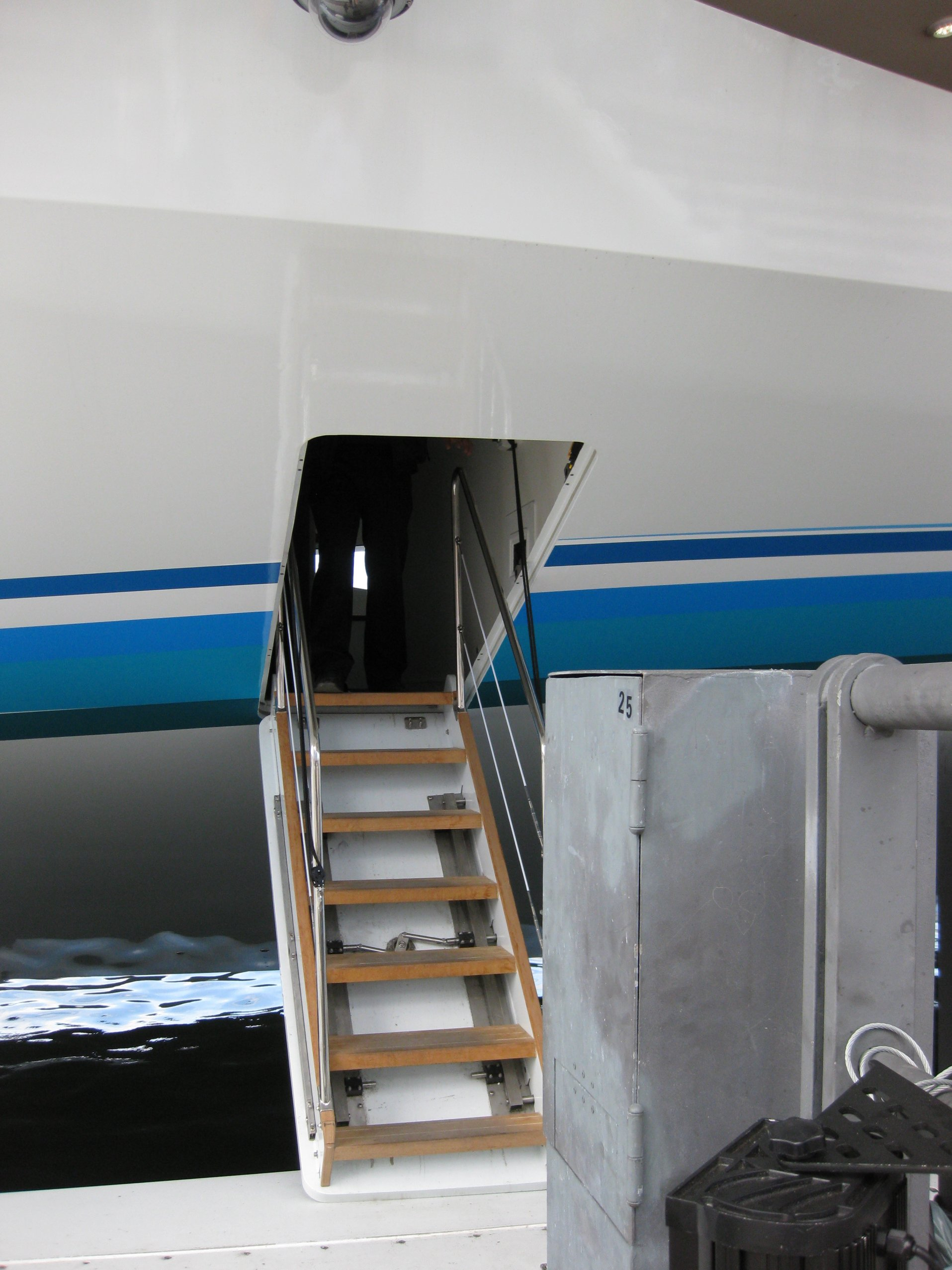
View of the gangway.

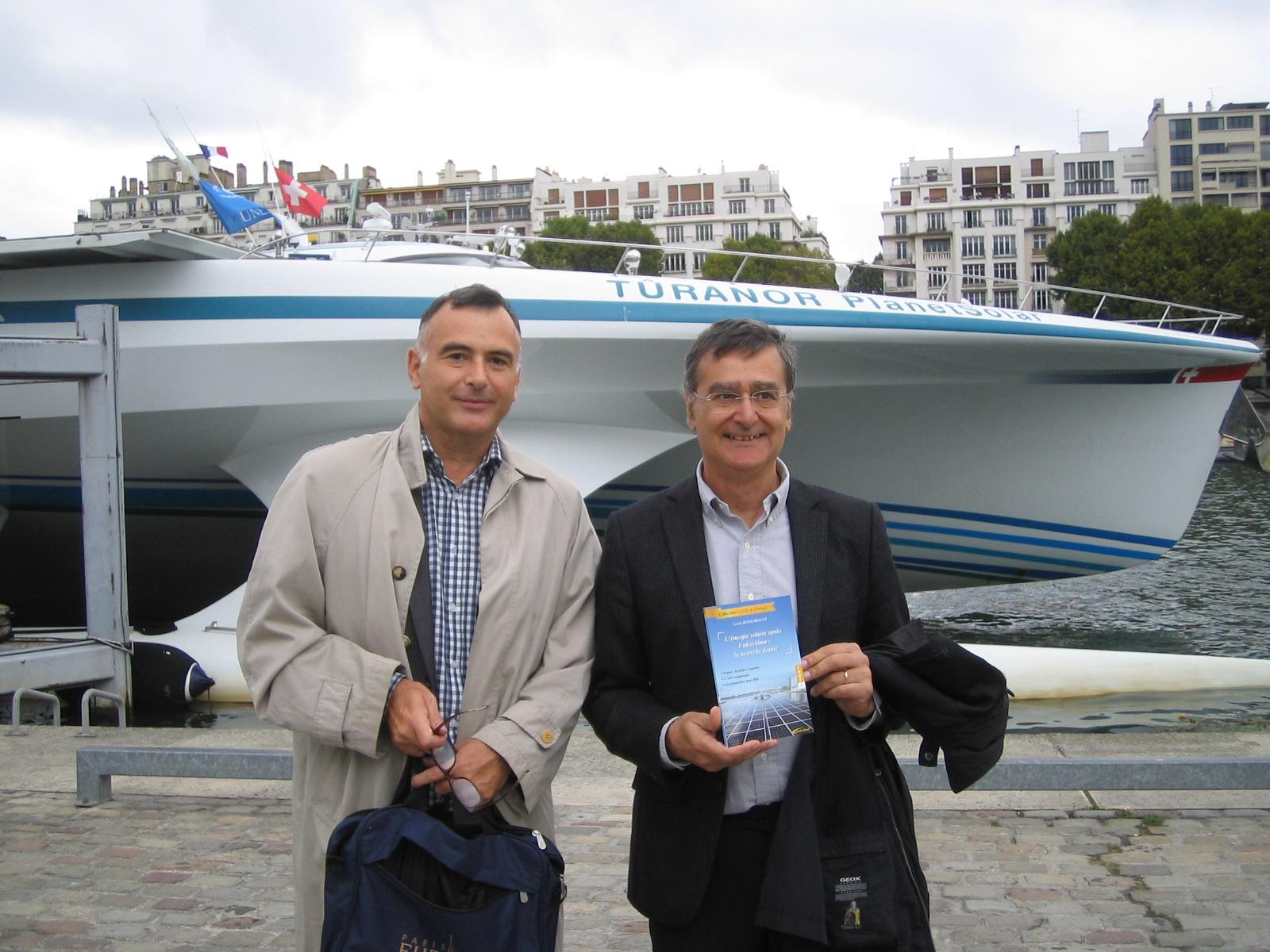
Louis Boisgibault (left), author of academic books on energy transition, meets crew.

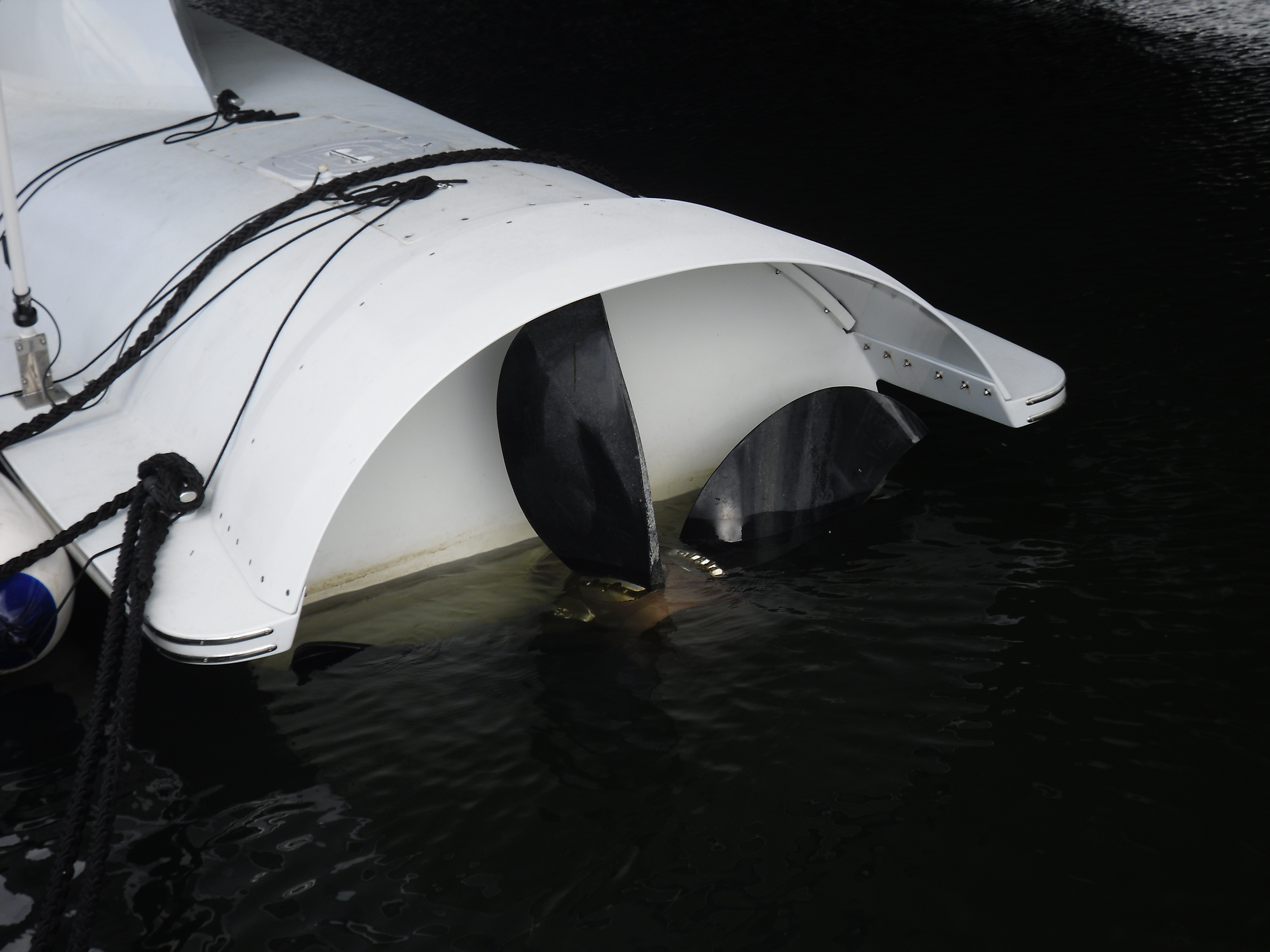
View of the surface piercing propeller.

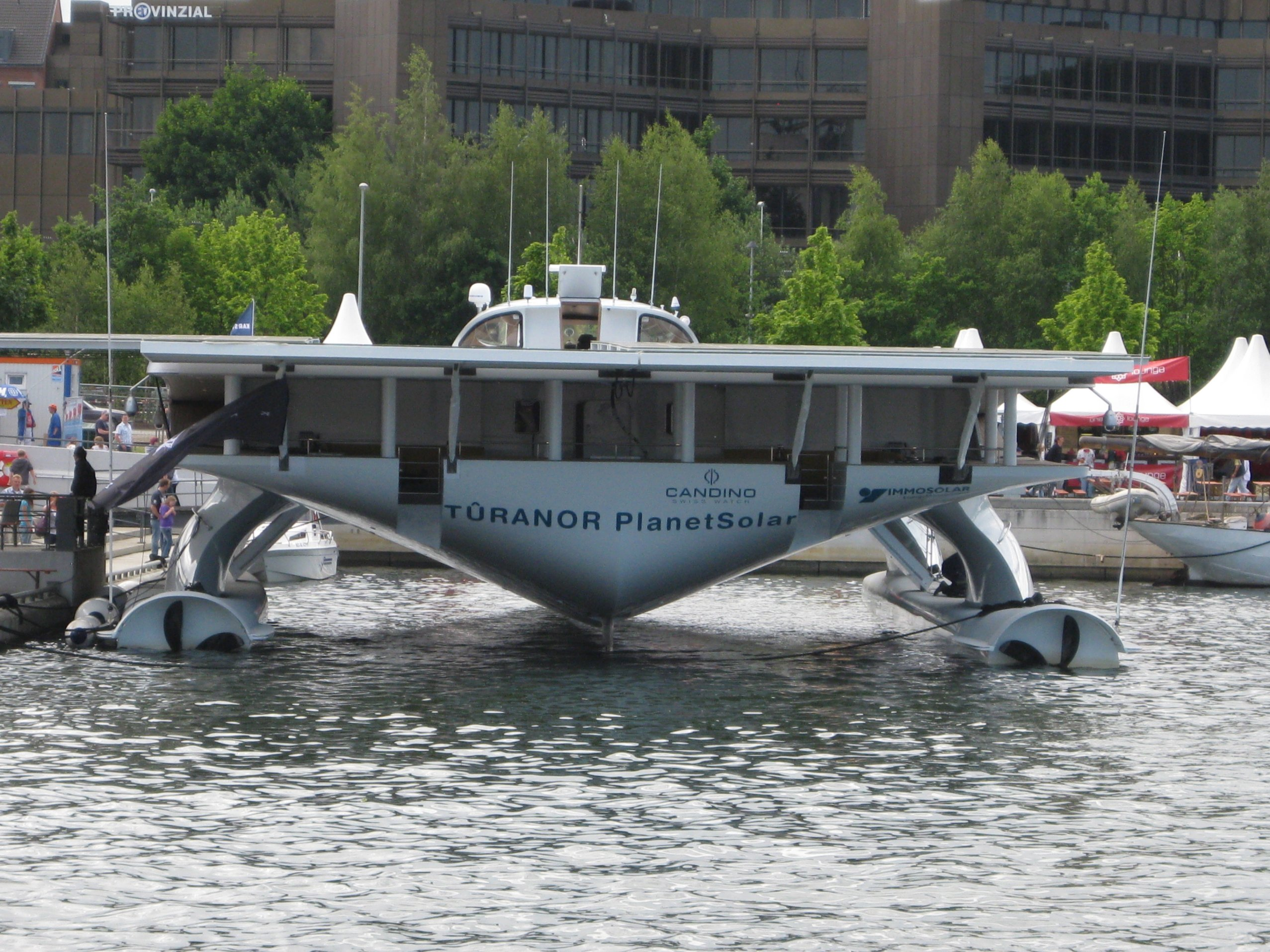
View of the stern of the ship.

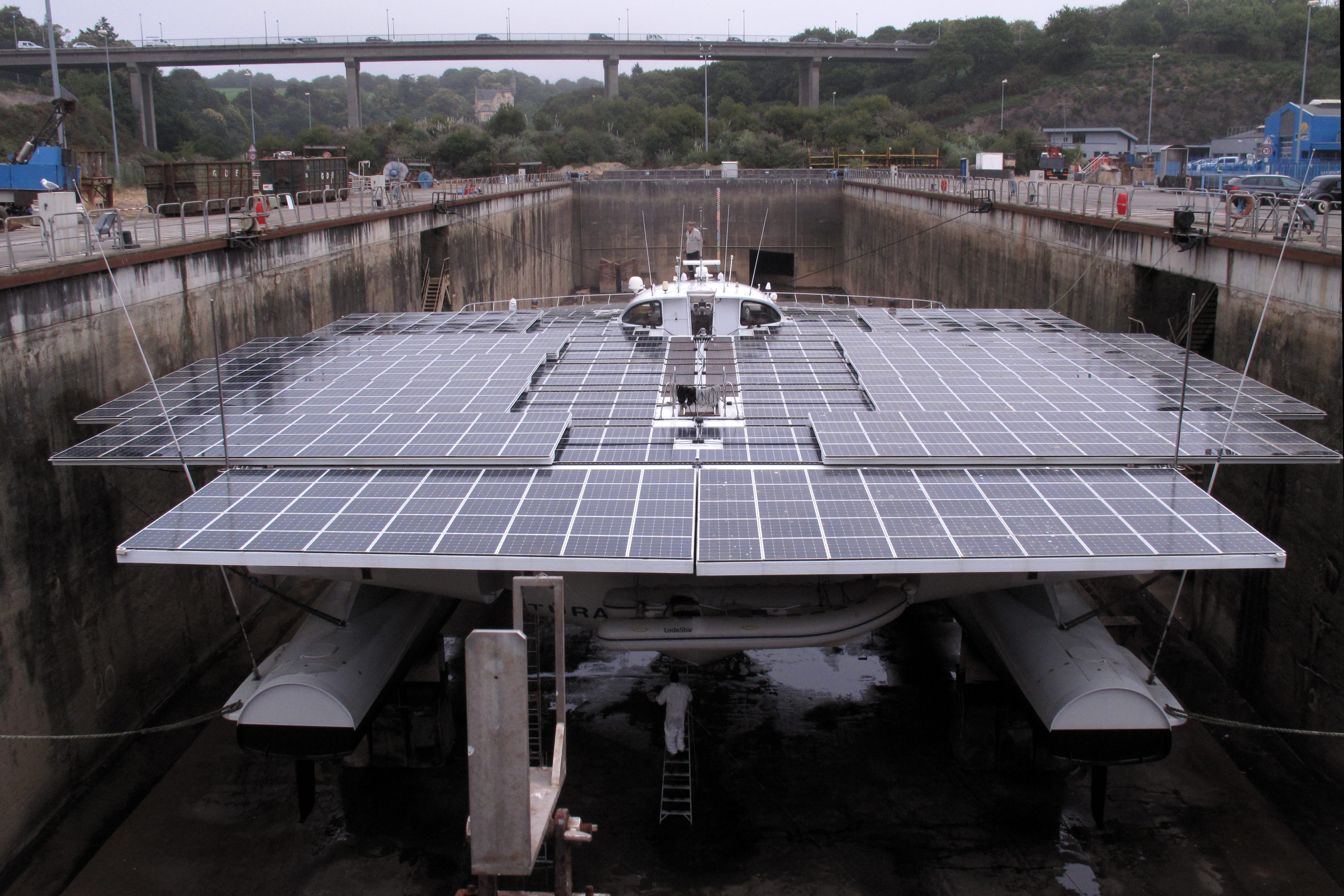
Top view of extended solar panels.

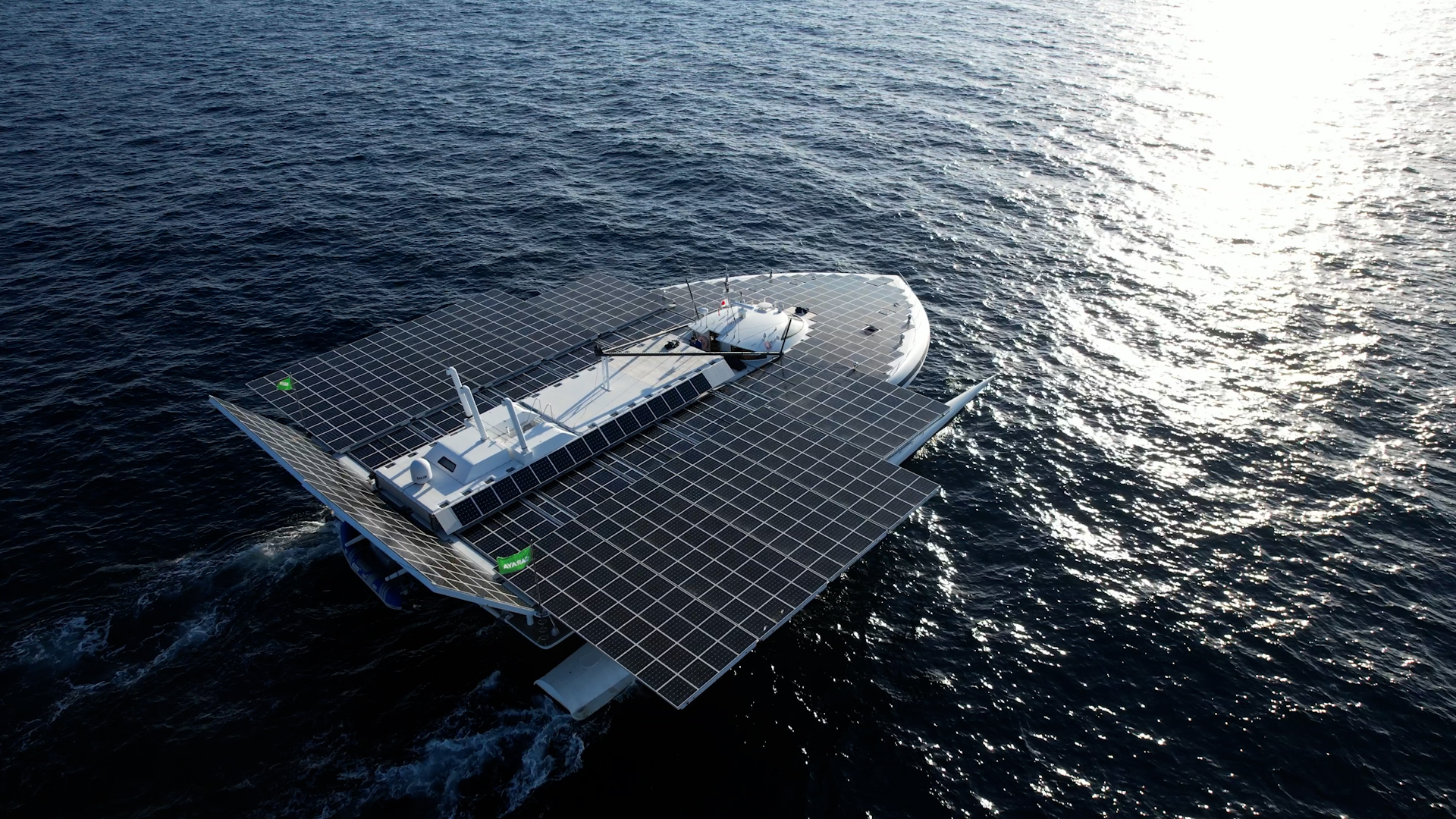
The vessel at sea, renamed Porrima by new owners, 2022.

== See also ==
- Aditya, India's first solar ferry
- MY Ady Gil, biodiesel-powered LOMOcean design
- List of circumnavigations
- List of solar-powered boats
- Solar Impulse, first solar aircraft to circumnavigate the world
- Solar vehicle
