= LOMOcean Marine =

New Zealand company

LOMOcean Marine is a naval architecture and yacht design company based in Auckland, New Zealand.

== History ==
LOMOcean Marine, previously known as Craig Loomes Design Group ltd., was incorporated in 1993, but has some designs that date back to 1986.

The company designs commercial, defence and pleasure boats for clients globally. The boats use advanced composite materials, such as carbon fibre and Kevlar, as well as aluminum and other such materials. The company has become known for designing a range of wave-piercing catamarans and trimarans, most notably, Earthrace, and Tûranor PlanetSolar. The company has also designed mono hull boats such as well as power catamarans. The boats include fire fighting boats, global circumnavigating boats, pleasure yachts, coastguard boats, defence vessels and research vessels.

== Notable designs ==
=== 39m The Beast expedition catamaran ===
The Beast is an expedition catamaran designed for owners Sir Michael Hill and Lady Christine Hill. It is a large volume displacement catamaran hull with high tunnel clearance. Accommodation is provided for up to 12 guests plus crew. The Beast won the 2020 World Superyacht Award for Displacement Motor Yachts Below 499GT 30m to 39.9m.

=== 25m Passagemaker Mollymawk ===
Mollymawk is a 25m passagemaker launched in 2021 and built by Circa Marine. Mollymawk was shortlisted for the Motor Yacht Under 25 Metres Award in The International Yacht & Aviation Awards 2022

=== Sampitres ===
Sampitres was launched in 2002 and was built by Vaudrey Miller Yachts. It is a pleasure boat designed for long-distance trips or to be used as a day boat. Sampitres is similar to Ultimate Lady and is also a wave-piercing catamaran. Sampitres has a range of 3490 nautical miles which means that it is capable of trans-Atlantic travel. The boat not as wide as Ultimate Lady, which means that it can be parked in the Mediterranean which is known for its tight berthing situations. It was listed as a finalist for the 2002 Super Yacht Society International design award. The boat can travel at a maximum speed of 28 knots and is 23.7 metres in length.

=== Bluefix Boatworks Northcape Custom Series ===
The Northcape Custom line is a series of custom-built sportfishing and cruising vessels manufactured by Bluefix Boatworks, a yacht construction company based in Opua, Bay of Islands, New Zealand. The range includes models such as the NorthCape 43, NorthCape 49, NorthCape 51, and NorthCape 58. The boats are constructed using foam-core composite materials with epoxy resin infusion techniques, and are designed for offshore performance, fuel efficiency, and durability. Northcape Custom vessels feature flared bows, tumblehome transoms, and layouts suited for both recreational and commercial applications.

=== 'X-18' Antasena-Class Combat Boat ===
The 'X-18 Antasena-class combat boat is a combat boat built by North Sea Boats for the Indonesian armed forces. Intended for operation by a crew of five, the catamaran is capable of transporting and beach landing up to twenty special forces personnel.

=== Hawere ===
Hawere is 15m long and has a draft of 1.2m. It is a research vessel that was built for the University of Auckland and it currently operates in the Leigh Marine Laboratory, north of Auckland. A two speed gearbox is installed in the boat so that the boat can operate while performing survey work, trolling or during dredging exercises. The boat has a top speed of 27 knots, cruise speed of 18 knots and a range of 375 nautical miles.

=== 'Klewang'-Class Fast Attack Craft Trimaran ===
The Klewang-class fast attack craft is a stealth, wave-piercing, carbon trimaran fast attack craft built by PT Lundin Industry Invest for the Indonesian Navy The vessel was powered by four MAN V12 diesel engines with total power output of 7,200 horsepower (5.4 MW), which propelled four MJP 550 waterjets, with two located on the outrigger and the other two on the main hull. Klewang has a maximum speed of 35 knots (65 km/h), with cruising speed at 22 knots (41 km/h). She has a range of around 2,000 nautical miles (3,700 km) at 16 knots (30 km/h). The vessel has a complement of 29 personnel, including a team of special forces.

=== Tûranor PlanetSolar ===
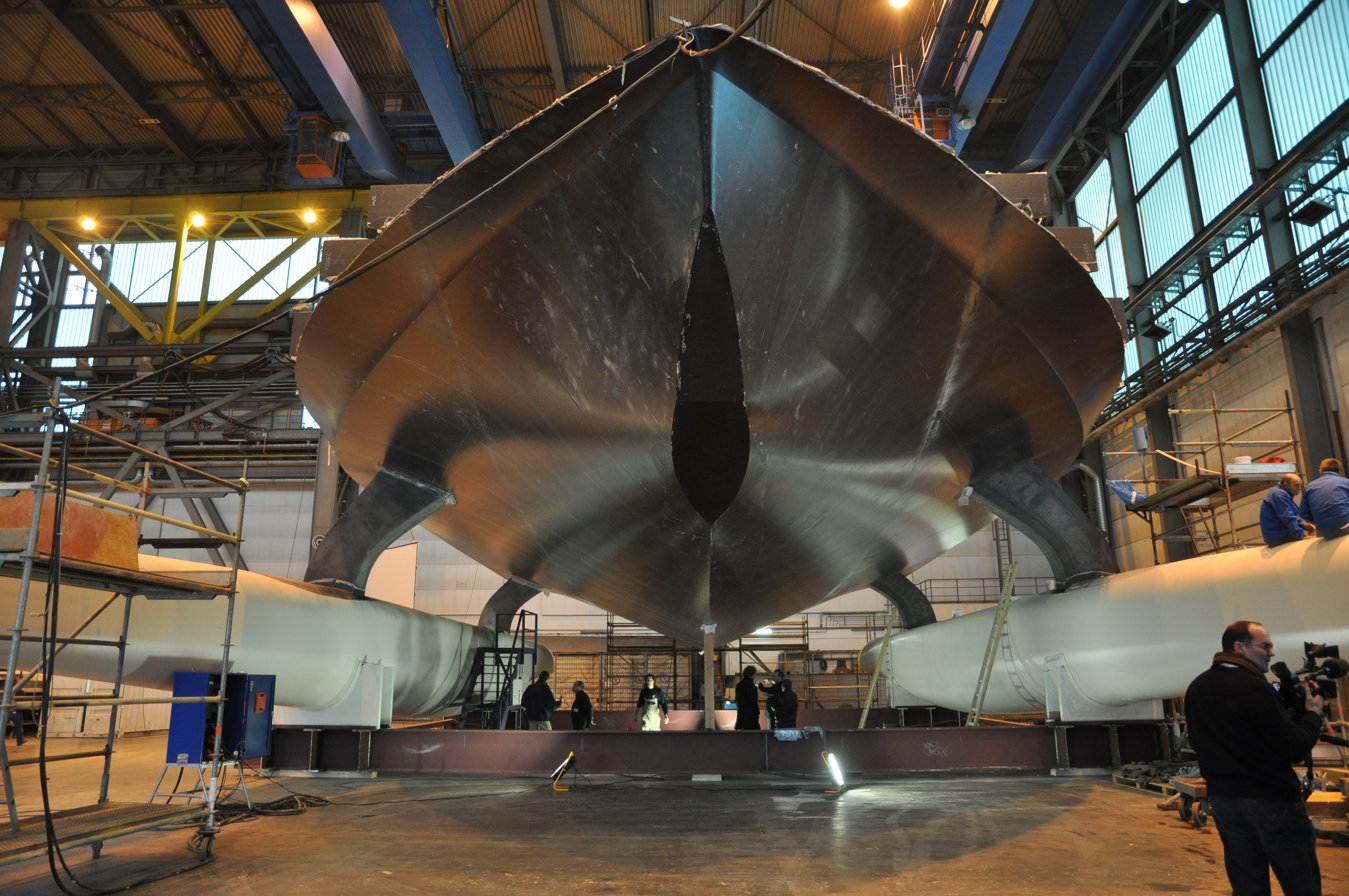
Construction of the PlanetSolar solar boat in Kiel, Germany in 2009

Tûranor PlanetSolar is a boat that was launched on 31 March 2010 and is entirely powered by solar panels. The boat's aim was to set the world circumnavigation record for a solar powered vessel, promoting the potential of solar power. The boat is the world's largest solar powered vessel.

In May 2012, it became the first solar electric vehicle ever to circumnavigate the globe taking 584 days between 2010 and 2012.

=== Ultimate Lady ===
Ultimate Lady was launched in 1998 and was designed to be used for long distance fishing trips and as a charter boat. It was one of the first wave-piercing catamarans designed to be used as a private motor yacht. A wave-piercing catamaran is a hull form that means that the two outer hulls go through waves instead of over them which means that the boat is more stable and can go faster in rough water. The boat has received the International Super Yacht Society Award in the 23–32 m category. Also, the boat has received awards in fishing competitions. Ultimate Lady is available as a charter boat to hire. Ultimate Lady is 26.7 metres long and has a beam of 10 metres, and can reach a maximum speed of 30 knots and has a cruise speed of 25 knots. Ultimate Lady has a range of 3000 nautical miles.

=== Yellow Water Taxi ===
The Yellow Water Taxi is a series of boats designed in collaboration with Grant Reed Designs and they are operational in the Waitemata Harbour in Auckland. The fleet of Yellow Water Taxis were launched in 2003. The taxis are 11.25 metres long and can be powered by either propellers or water jets which are powered by one Scania diesel engine.

=== 148m Moonset wave-piercing trimaran ===
The Moonset wave-piercing trimaran is a concept boat and has not yet been built. This 148-metre concept design has been based on the design of Earthrace, the round-the-world record holder for a power boat. Moonset uses the hull form of Earthrace, and can still be used as a luxury yacht. The boat does this by using a wave-piercing trimaran hull, similar to that found on Earthrace (Ady Gil).

A wave-piercing hull is when a boat pushes through a wave instead of over it by slightly submerging the boat. The design has a three level owner's suite, a private owners lounge and enough rooms for 28 guests. The boat can also potentially have art galleries, libraries, conference spaces, private lounges, bar facilities, helicopter facilities and fold-out balconies.

=== Aquavette ===
Aquavette was launched in 2004 and was built by Calibre Boats. It is an 11-metre-long (36 ft) catamaran that has been designed as a pleasure boat with a focus on sport fishing. This boat has two sleeping compartments and a 1m long fishing aft deck. Aquavette has also been designed in a way that it can be transported on a trailer. Aquavette has a top speed of 40 knots and a cruise speed of 25 knots.

=== Black Pearl (DP-08) ===
The motor yacht Black Pearl, also known as DP-08, was launched on 29 December 2010 in New Zealand and was built by Diverse Projects. The boat has been designed as a long-range passage-making vessel that will be used for a world cruise that will start in the Mediterranean and will end in Australia. DP-08 is powered by two Caterpillar C18 ACERT 600 horsepower (450 kW) engines and has a trans-Atlantic range of 2,200 nautical miles (4,100 km). Due to the mono hull form, it is able to cruise at 13 knots (24 km/h). Black Pearl will be fitted with zero speed stabilizers.

=== DMS Interceptor ===
The DMS Interceptor was built by DMS (Destination Marine Services) for the Royal Malaysian Customs. The design is a follow-up on work for both the Malaysian Police and the Royal Malaysian Customs. Four of these boats have been built for DMS in Johor in South Malaysia. The series of 16.5-metre boats have a top speed of 65 knots and are used for the task of intercepting other boats as an enforcer of customs laws in the waters in and around Malaysia.

=== Earthrace (Ady Gil) ===
Earthrace, later renamed MY Ady Gil, was launched in 2006 and was built by Calibre boats.

=== Excalibre ===
Excalibre was designed to suit the "typical New Zealand Outdoorsman". The boat has been designed for sport fishing, bottom fishing, spear fishing, diving and swimming. Excalibre is 11.6 metres long, has a top speed of 30 knots and a cruise speed of 24 knots.

=== Massive Attack ===
Massive Attack is a power boat that has been designed for water skiing and the possibility of offshore powerboat racing. The hull is light and weighs 225 kg. Massive Attack is 5.9mlong and has a top speed of 80 miles per hour.

=== Patrol One ===
Patrol One was built in Mauritius by Diogene Marine and was designed to be used as a private yacht in the Indian Ocean surrounding Mauritius. It is a trimaran which means that the boat is stable in rough seas. Patrol One is able to travel at speeds of up to 29 knots across the 250 nautical mile stretch of water between the islands of Mauritius and Saint Brandon and back again without refuelling.

=== Power Sail ===
Power Sail is the name of a range of 15 and 20-metre long boats. The boats can both motor and sail at 18 knots. This is because the boat has a Z-drive system that means that the motor can retract horizontally and is covered by a door. When the boat is sailing, the motor is retracted to reduce drag.

=== Rhythm ===
Rhythm was launched in early 2003 and is used as a private fishing boat in New Zealand. The boat was designed to look similar to some US lobster boats, but it uses modern hull technology Rhythm is 13.5 metres long and has a top speed of 27 knots and a cruise speed of 20 knots.

=== Spirit ===
Spirit was launched in 1999 and was built by Friendship Yachts. Spirit is a pleasure boat that uses wave-piercing technology which means that the boat is more stable and faster in rough seas. The boat has three cabins, a Jacuzzi, and a platform at the aft of the boat that can be lowered from a metre above the water line to 500 mm below the water line for swimming, fishing and retrieving tender boats. Spirit is 24.6 metres long and has a top speed of 25 knots and cruises at 22 knots.

== Awards ==
- 2020 Displacement Motor Yachts Below 499GT 30m to 39.9m (The Beast)
- 2012 Guinness World Records: First circumnavigation by solar-powered boat (MS TÛRANOR PlanetSolar)
- 2012 Guinness World Records: Largest solar-powered boat (MS TÛRANOR PlanetSolar)
- 2008 The World Powerboat Circumnavigation Record (Earthrace)
- 2002 Super Yacht Society International Design Award finalist (Sampitres)
- 1998 International Super Yacht of the Year award (Ultimate Lady)
- 1998 Spruce Goose Design Competition winner (WP50)
- 1994 Boating NZ magazine Fishing Boat of the Year award (Tournament 7)
- 1993 Powerboat Race Organisation efficiency award (Tournament 8)
- 1993 Volvo Penta Powerboat Rally multi-class winner (Tournament 8)
