= KRI Klewang =

Klewang-class Fast Attacking Craft of Indonesian Navy

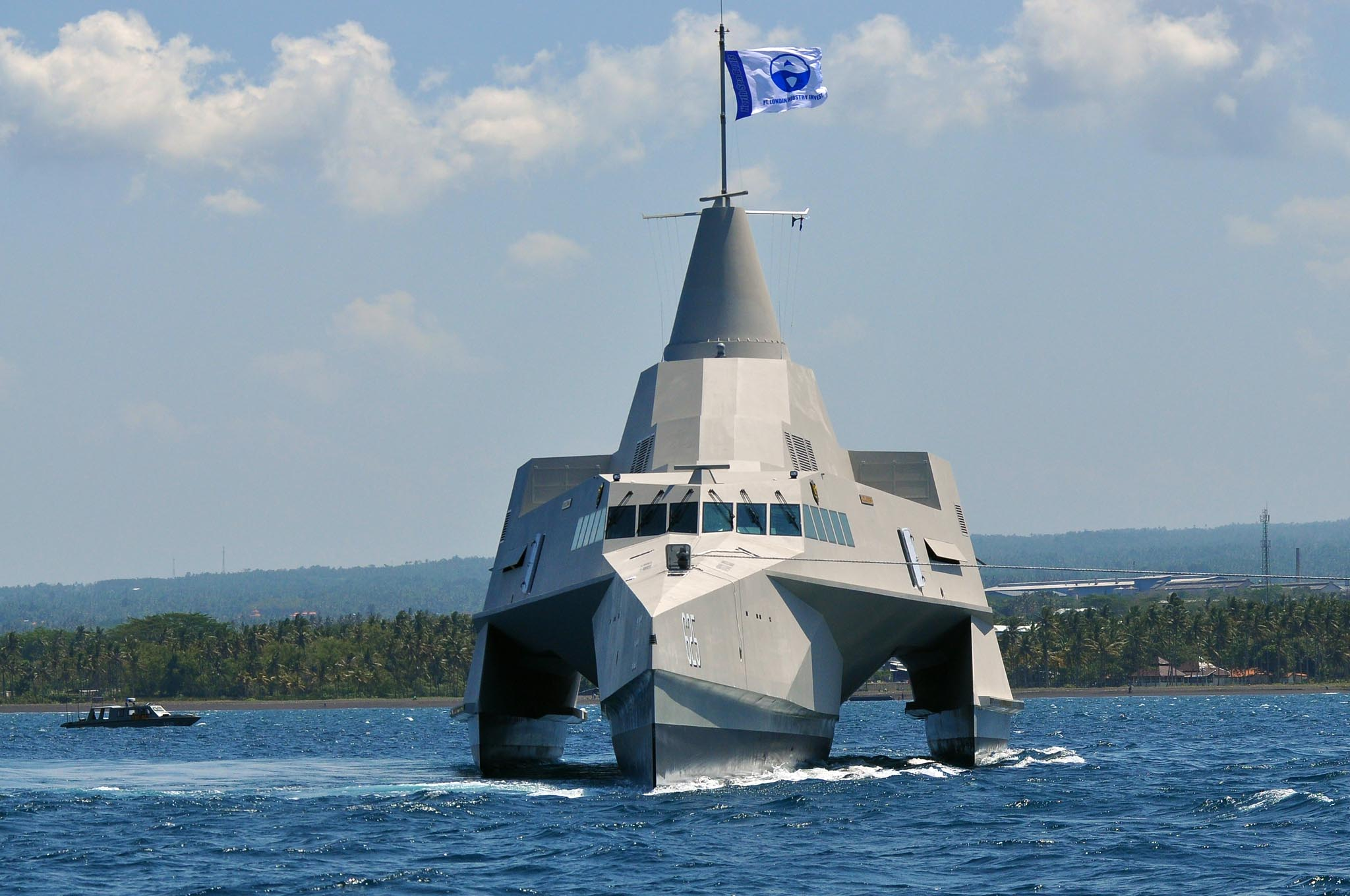
- KRI Klewang in 2012

History

Indonesia
- Name: Klewang
- Namesake: Klewang
- Builder: PT Lundin Industry Invest, Banyuwangi
- Cost: 114 billion rupiah
- Laid down: 2010
- Launched: 29 August 2012
- Identification: Pennant number: 625
- Fate: Destroyed by fire on 28 September 2012

General characteristics
- Class & type: Klewang-class fast attack craft
- Displacement: 219 t (216 long tons)
- Length: 63 m (206 ft 8 in)
- Beam: 16 m (52 ft 6 in)
- Draught: 1.2 m (3 ft 11 in)
- Installed power: 7,200 horsepower (5.4 MW)
- Propulsion: 4 × MAN V12 diesels; 4 × MJP 550 waterjets
- Speed: 35 knots (65 km/h; 40 mph)
- Range: 2,000 nmi (3,704 km; 2,302 mi) at 16 knots (30 km/h; 18 mph)
- Boats & landing craft carried: 1 × 11 m high-speed RHIB
- Complement: 29
- Armament: Planned on Klewang; 4-8 × C-705 SSM; 1 × Type 730 CIWS

KRI Klewang (625) (builder model number X3K) was a Klewang-class stealth trimaran fast attack craft launched by PT Lundin Industry Invest for the Indonesian Navy in 2012. She was destroyed by a fire on 28 September 2012 while undergoing fitting out.

== Design ==
KRI Klewang has a length of 63 m (207 ft), a beam of 16 m (52 ft), with a draught of 1.2 m (3.9 ft), and displacement of 219 t (216 long tons). The vessel was powered by four MAN V12 diesel engines with total power output of 7,200 horsepower (5.4 MW), which propelled four MJP 550 waterjets, with two located on the outrigger and the other two on the main hull. Klewang has a maximum speed of 35 knots (65 km/h), with cruising speed at 22 knots (41 km/h). She has a range of around 2,000 nautical miles (3,700 km) at 16 knots (30 km/h). The vessel has a complement of 29 personnel, including a team of special forces.

Klewang was planned to be armed with four and up to eight C-705 anti-ship missiles in enclosed launchers and a Type 730 CIWS in stealthy turret. According to the builder, the vessel also able to be armed with Penguin or Exocet missiles and naval gun of up to 57 mm caliber without affecting the stability of the vessel. She also carried an 11 m high-speed rigid-hulled inflatable boat for the special forces team.

== See also ==
- RV Triton
- Sea Shadow (IX-529)
