= Klewang-class fast attack craft =

Stealth trimaran fast attack craft of Indonesian Navy

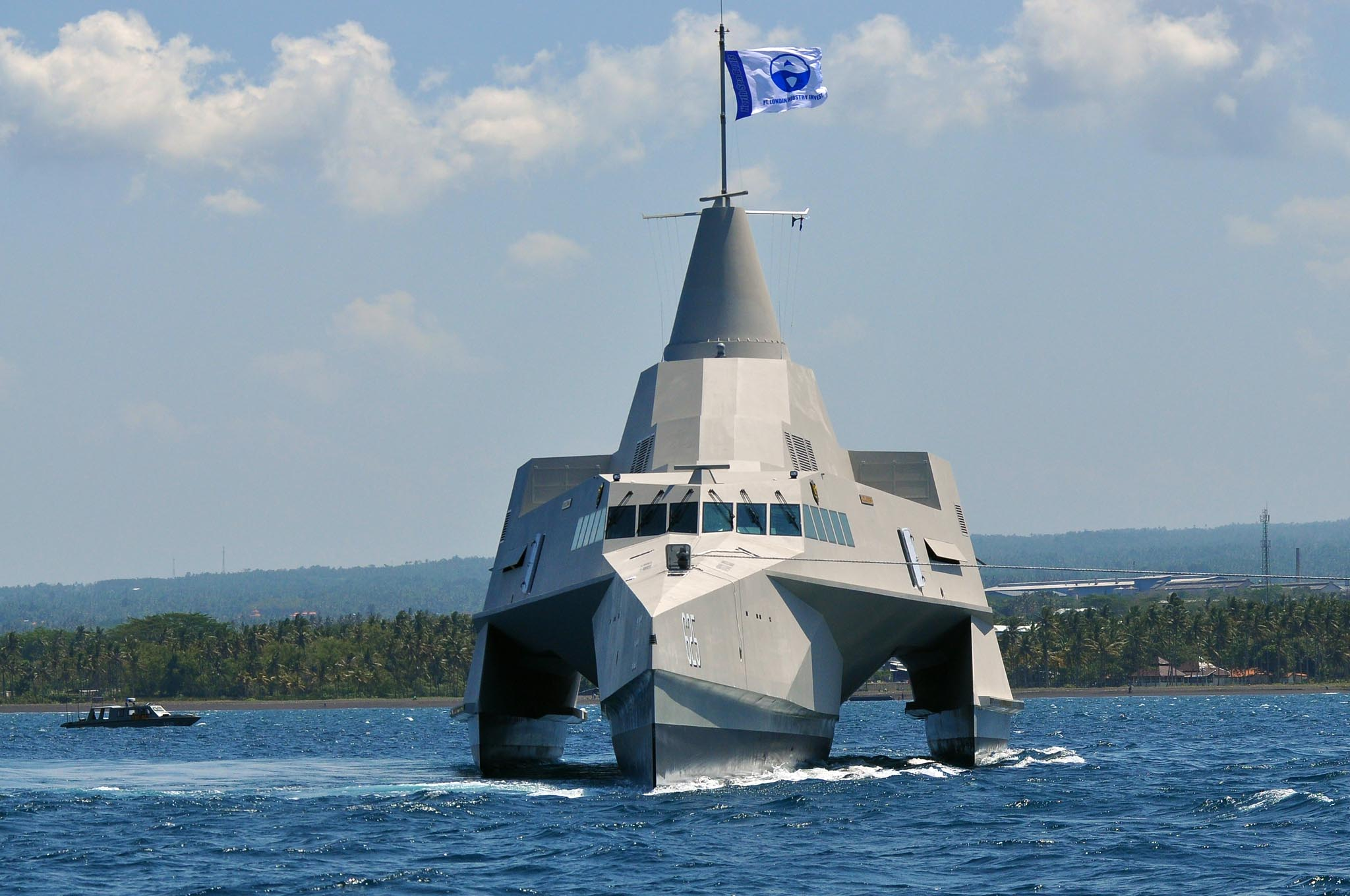
- KRI Klewang in 2012

Class overview
- Name: Klewang class
- Builders: PT Lundin Industry Invest
- Operators: Indonesian Navy
- Preceded by: Mandau class
- Built: 2010–2021
- In commission: 2022–present
- Planned: 4
- Completed: 2
- Active: 1
- Lost: 1

General characteristics
- Type: Stealth Fast attack craft
- Displacement: 219 t (216 long tons)
- Length: 63 m (206 ft 8 in)
- Beam: 16 m (52 ft 6 in)
- Draught: 1.2 m (3 ft 11 in)
- Installed power: 7,200 horsepower (5.4 MW)
- Propulsion: 4 × MAN V12 diesels; 4 × MJP 550 waterjets
- Speed: 35 knots (65 km/h; 40 mph)
- Range: 2,000 nmi (3,704 km; 2,302 mi) at 16 knots (30 km/h; 18 mph)
- Boats & landing craft carried: 1 × 11 m high-speed RHIB
- Complement: 29
- Armament: Planned on Klewang; 4-8 × C-705 SSM; 1 × Type 730 CIWS; Golok as commissioned; 1 × 20 mm Yugoimport M71/08; 2 × 12.7 mm M2 Browning; Planned on Golok; Naval Strike Missile

The Klewang-class fast attack craft is a stealth, wave-piercing, carbon trimaran fast attack craft built by PT Lundin Industry Invest and designed by LOMOcean Marine. Shortly after being floated out, on 28 September 2012, the lead ship KRI Klewang was destroyed by fire while being outfitted at shipyard. The second ship in the class KRI Golok was launched on 21 August 2021.

== Design ==
KRI Klewang has a length of 63 m (207 ft), a beam of 16 m (52 ft), with a draught of 1.2 m (3.9 ft), and displacement of 219 t (216 long tons). The vessel was powered by four MAN V12 diesel engines with total power output of 7,200 horsepower (5.4 MW), which propelled four MJP 550 waterjets, with two located on the outrigger and the other two on the main hull. Klewang has a maximum speed of 35 knots (65 km/h), with cruising speed at 22 knots (41 km/h). She has a range of around 2,000 nautical miles (3,700 km) at 16 knots (30 km/h). The vessel has a complement of 29 personnel, including a team of special forces.

Klewang was planned to be armed with four and up to eight C-705 anti-ship missiles in enclosed launchers and a Type 730 CIWS in stealthy turret. According to the builder, the vessel also able to be armed with Penguin or Exocet missiles and naval gun of up to 57 mm caliber without affecting the stability of the vessel. She also carried an 11 m high-speed rigid-hulled inflatable boat for the special forces team.

== History ==
The Indonesian Navy ordered the first of four for delivery starting in 2012. The first of these was named KRI Klewang and was launched on 29 August 2012; however, only four weeks later the ship caught fire on 28 September while undergoing fit-out in Banyuwangi, and was completely destroyed.

== Replacement ==
A replacement 63-meter trimaran was ordered in Banyuwangi and was expected to be launched in early 2016. During this interim period, advances in infusable vinylester resin chemistry have led to the incorporation of nanoparticles into the resin. These particles facilitate the transfer of the resin through the carbon/glass fiber matrix and enable the use of fire-retardant grade vinylester for infusion. As a result, the carbon fiber composite structure of the new vessel becomes self-extinguishing. The ship was launched on 21 August 2021, and named as KRI Golok (hull no. 688). Golok was commissioned on 14 January 2022 at Surabaya.

== Ship in the class ==
Ships	Pennant number	Launched	Commissioned	Builder	Notes
KRI Klewang	625 (X3K)	29 August 2012		PT Lundin Industry Invest	Destroyed by fire in 2012
KRI Golok	688	21 August 2021	14 January 2022	PT Lundin Industry Invest	
