= North Sea Boats =

International boat building company

North Sea Boats (PT Lundin Industry Invest)
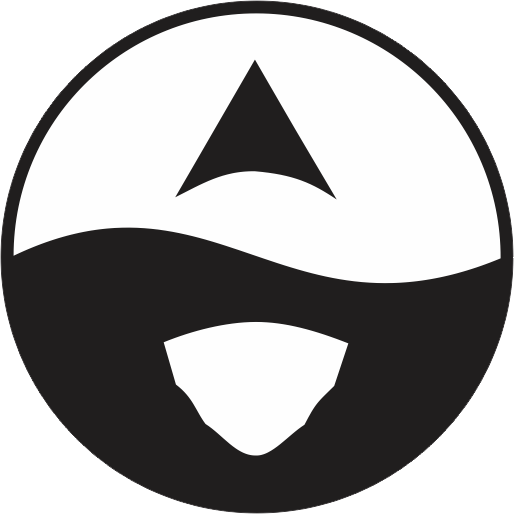
- Industry: Boat building Shipyard
- Founded: 2003
- Founder: John Lundin; Lizza Lundin
- Headquarters: Banyuwangi, Indonesia
- Number of locations: Banyuwangi
- Number of employees: 375 (January 2019)
- Website: www.northseaboats.com

North Sea Boats is an international boat-building company specialized in building craft for military, law enforcement, SAR, commercial, and high-performance applications. The company has a presence in Sweden, Singapore, and Indonesia, with its headquarters located at Banyuwangi, East Java, Indonesia. North Sea Boats was founded in 2003 by John and Lizza Lundin as a trading name for PT Lundin Industry Invest.

== History ==
John Lundin grew up with boats, as his father Allan Lundin founded the Swedeship company, which operated shipyards including Gotland Shipyard and Djupvik Shipyard in Sweden. After the Swedish shipyard crisis, the Swedeship company was the largest privately owned boat-building company in Sweden. It was through Sweden that John first came to Indonesia in the mid-1990s to investigate the company's expansion opportunities. Allan Lundin died from cancer in 1996, and Swedeship was sold. However, John and his Indonesian wife, Lizza, moved there permanently. After some years of small-scale furniture manufacturing to gain experience in the business culture there, they founded the boat-building company North Sea Boats in 2003.

== Products ==
The boats are constructed using composite production techniques such as dual-surface vacuum core resin infusion. All materials used are Lloyds/DNV Class Approved and include carbon composite fiber, E Glass multi-axial non-woven stitched reinforcing, and vinyl ester resins.

The various models incorporate "open architecture" deck plans that can be configured to perform multi-role tasks in a broad range of operational environments. They can be powered by inboard diesel engines, outboard motors, transom drives, or waterjets.

=== X3K ===
A 63-meter-long carbon composite stealth trimaran missile ship, designed and engineered by LOMOcean Marine. The Indonesian Navy ordered the first of four for delivery starting in 2012. The first of these was named KRI Klewang (hull number 625) and was launched on 29 August 2012; however, only four weeks later the ship caught fire on 28 September while undergoing fit-out in Banyuwangi, and was destroyed.

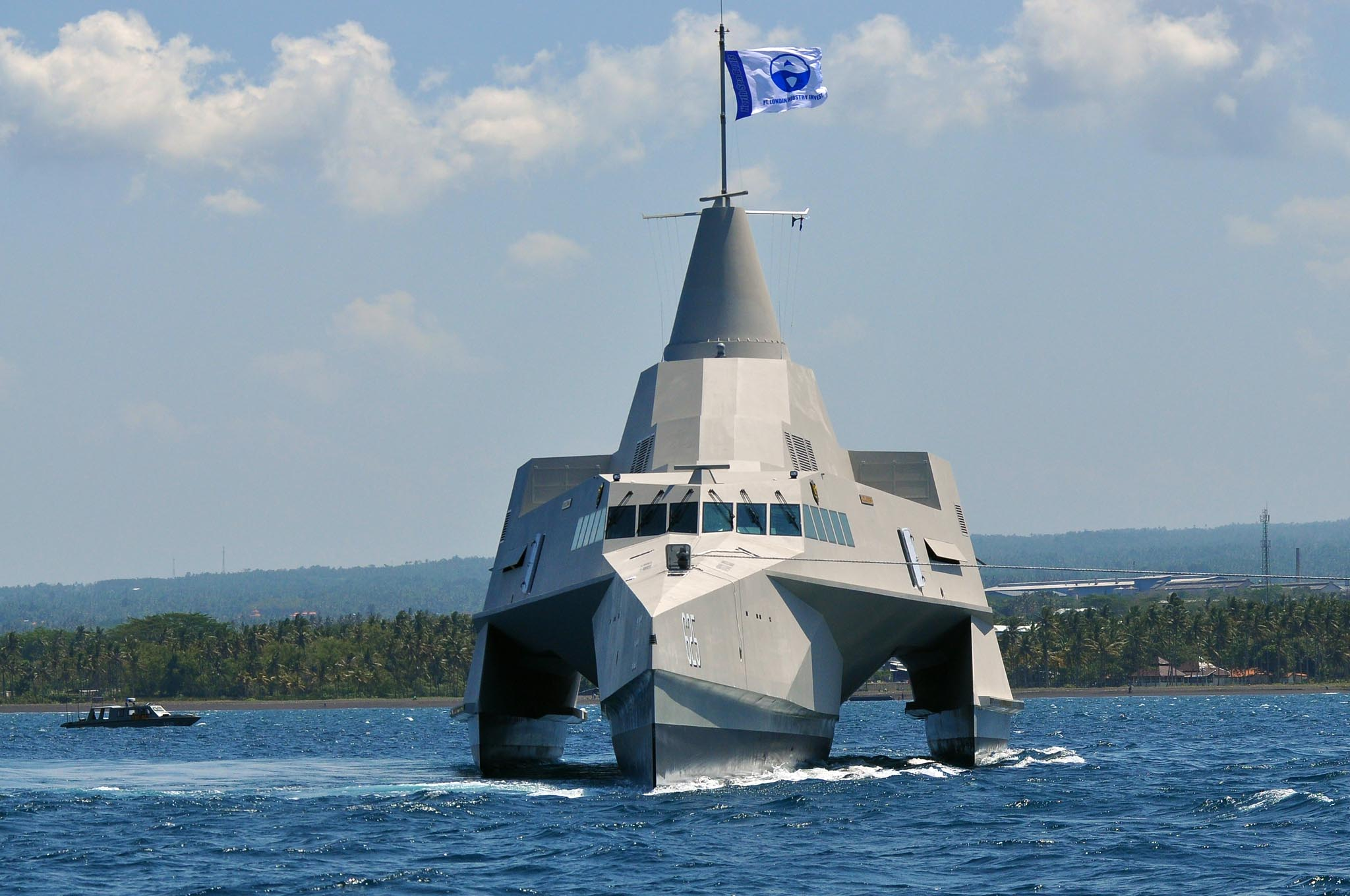
Trimaran

A replacement 63 m Trimaran is now under construction in Banyuwangi and is expected to be launched in early 2016. In the interim period, advances in infusible vinyl ester resin chemistry have seen the incorporation of nanoparticles into the resin. These particles aid the transfer of the resin through the carbon/glass fiber matrix and allow the use of fire retardant grade viny Lester for infusion. This makes the carbon fiber composite structure of the new vessel self-extinguishing.

According to Radar Banyuwangi, PT Lundin Industry Invest highlights consistent product quality, on-time delivery, and steadily improving engineering and manufacturing capability as factors supporting its competitiveness in the international market.

=== Bonefish USV ===
Saab and PT Lundin (North Sea Boats) revealed a mockup of a trimaran Unmanned Surface Vessel (USV) at Indo Defence 2014.

It was formally unveiled by Indonesia's defense minister General (ret.) Ryamizard Ryacudu and Chief of Naval Staff Admiral Marsetio in a joint ribbon-cutting ceremony on the first day of the show.

Development of the Bonefish demonstrator began at the start of 2014, the concept marrying Saab Australia's mission systems integration expertise with LOMOcean's trimaran hull form and structures. The mockup was built in approximately six months at PT Lundin's composite boat production facility in Banyuwangi, East Java.

Capable of speeds of up to 40kts, Bonefish is designed to incorporate a wide range of sensors, satellite-based control, and a modular payload bay to enable role flexibility. Potential missions could include anti-piracy, maritime surveillance, anti-submarine warfare, mine countermeasures, search and rescue, and hydrography.

=== X2K ===
The 10.3 X2K Range and the 11.3 m X2K RHIB (Rigid Hull Inflatable Boat) Range models incorporate a double-stepped hull design that is based on an offshore race boat design from Sweden. It is a high-performance model capable of speeds over 50 knots.

There are several X2K variants in production, which include:

- Sports / Fishing - center console recreational model
- VIP Transfer - with an enclosed cabin for passenger transfers
- Dive - configured for diving, or as a work boat.
- Interceptor - designed for patrol and a fast interception.
- Sports RHIB - center console recreational model
- Special Forces / Operations RHIB - serving military and law enforcement roles.
- Interceptor RHIB - designed for patrol and a fast interception.
- SAR / Pilot / Work RHIB - configured for Search & Rescue, Pilot, and workboat roles.

=== X10 RHIB ===
The X10 is a 10.5 m RHIB model with a Deep "Vee" hull design. It is designed for patrol or commercial duty and can be fitted with either inboard diesel engines and waterjets, conventional stern drives, or outboard motors.

=== X38 Catamaran ===
The X38 is a 12.3 m, stepped-hull, power catamaran designed for passenger transfers, diving, conservation, patrol, and combat operations. It can also be used for law enforcement, medical evacuations, and rescue operations.

=== Tank Boat ===
The X18 Tank Boat is a catamaran design for coastal and riverine environments, with design and naval architecture by LOMOcean Marine. It has a crew of 6, and will also carry a High-speed Interdiction RIB for boarding and SEAL insertion. The main weapon system of the X18 Tank Boat is the CMI Defense Cockerill 3105. The 105 mm gun is also capable of firing the Cockerill Falarick 105 Gun Launched Anti-Tank Guided Missile (GLATGM). It can be augmented with a Bofors LEMUR Remote Weapons Systems incorporating 7.62 – 30 mm GPMG/ Cannon. In April 2021, a working prototype underwent testing. The prototype however uses 30 mm cannon as its main gun.

=== X33 (USV) ===
The X33 (also referred to as X33 KSR) is a high-speed coastal platform being developed as a hybrid manned and unmanned surface vessel (USV). At Indo Defence 2025, it was presented as an unmanned surface vehicle intended for offensive coastal operations.
