= Ady Gil =

Israeli animal rights activist

Ady Gil (Hebrew: אדי גיל) is an Israeli animal rights activist living in Hollywood neighborhood of Los Angeles.

Gil was raised in Ramat Gan. He joined the Israel Air Force from where he retired at the age of 22. He emigrated to USA. There in partnership with Erez Ram, also a veteran of the Israeli Defence Forces, he founded in 1992, American Hi Definition Inc, a company involved in high definition big screen video projection. In 1997 with Erez Ram and Joe Shckelford they started another company, Sweetwater Digital. In November 2010, the companies were acquired by NEP Broadcasting.

After this sale Gil became a full-time animal rights activist. He donated US$6 million to his organization Ady Gil World Conservation. Gil set up a shelter for cats and dogs in Los Angeles and paid for sterilization of 6000 cats in Israel. He built a large roosting structure for eagles in a wildlife sanctuary on Mount Carmel. Gil donated millions to Sea Shepherd Conservation Society to refurbish a ship for use for its anti-whaling campaigns. The vessel, the former Earthrace, was renamed Ady Gil, and sank 290 km from Antarctica after a collision incident with the Japanese whaling ship Shonan Maru No 2. The loss of the ship has been the subject of litigation between Gil and Paul Watson, founder and director of Sea Shepherd Conservation Society. In December 2014, Gil paid US$2 million to rescue 1300 monkeys from a facility that bred them so that they would not be exported to the United States for being subjected to experiments that maimed and killed them. Ady Gil World Conservation sued Los Angeles Animal Services for closing animal shelters during the 2020 coronavirus pandemic.
