= MY Ady Gil =

Wave-piercing power trimaran, 2006–2010

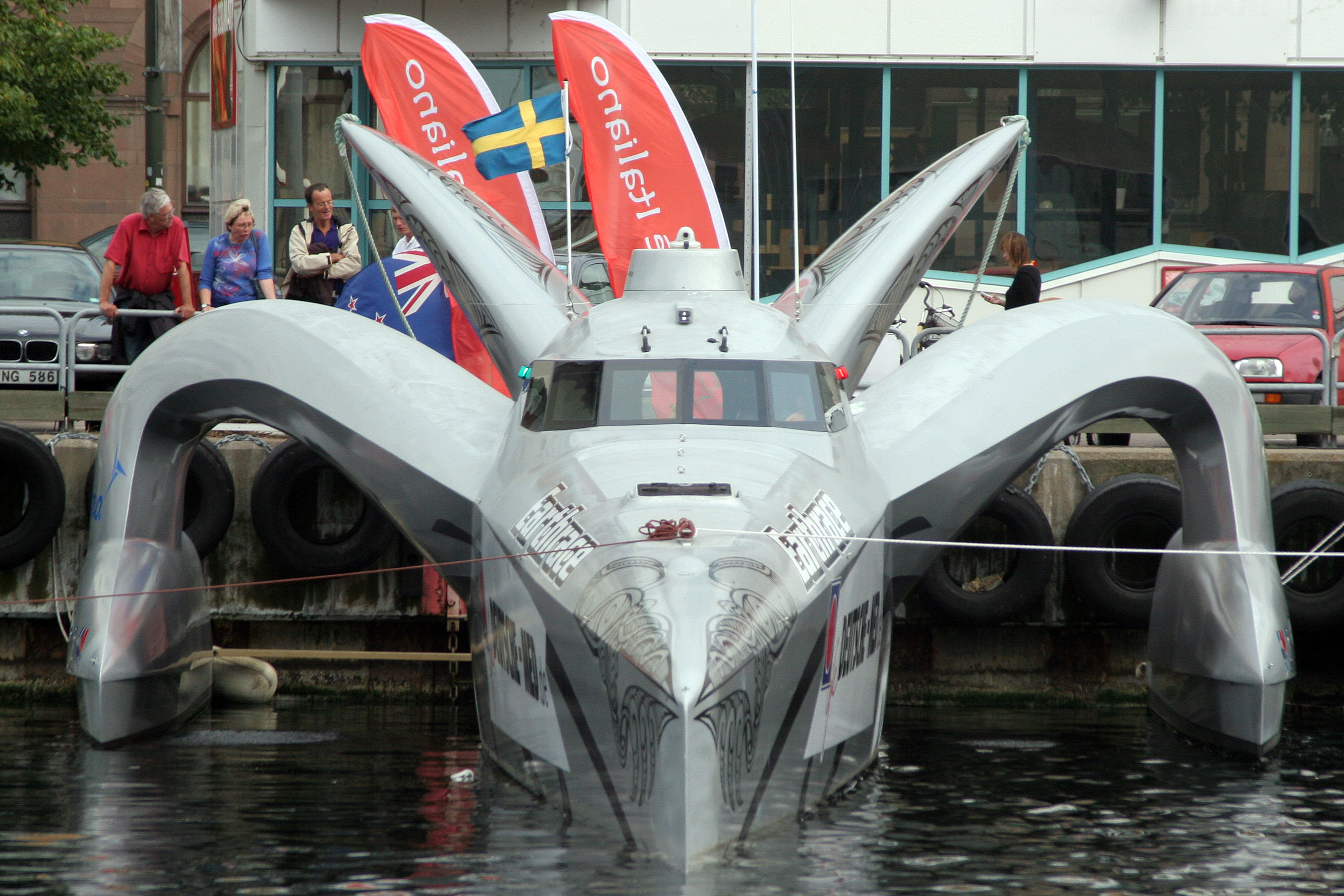

History
- Name: Earthrace (2006–2009); Ady Gil (2009–2010)
- Port of registry: Auckland, New Zealand
- Builder: Calibre Boats
- Laid down: January 2005
- Launched: 22 February 2006
- Fate: Severely damaged on 7 January 2010 at 17:20 UTC after collision with MV Shōnan Maru 2 at scuttled. region:AQ_type:waterbody_source:kolossus-dewiki 64°01′50″S 143°05′23″E

General characteristics
- Type: Trimaran
- Displacement: 13 ton
- Length: 78 ft (24 m)
- Beam: 23 ft (7.0 m)
- Draught: 4 ft (1.2 m)
- Propulsion: 2 × 400 kW (540 hp) Cummins Mercruiser; Gearboxes: ZF 305A (single speed)
- Speed: Claimed Top Speed: 32 knots (59.3 km/h)
- Range: 12,000 nautical miles (22,224 km) from 12,000 litres (2,640 imp gal) of fuel capacity
- Complement: 4–8

MY Ady Gil (formerly Earthrace) was a 78-foot (24 m), wave-piercing trimaran originally created as part of a project to break the world record for circumnavigating the globe in a powerboat. Powered by biodiesel fuel, the vessel was also capable of running on regular diesel fuel. It used other eco-friendly materials such as vegetable oil lubricants, hemp composites, and non-toxic anti-fouling, and had features such as bilge-water filters.

The first attempt at the global circumnavigation record in 2007 was ill-fated. The boat encountered mechanical problems on several occasions and collided with a Guatemalan fishing boat, killing one of the other boat's crew. While the crew of the Earthrace was later absolved of any responsibility, the delay forced the restart of the record attempt, while more mechanical issues later aborted it. In 2008, the second journey proved successful—though again, numerous technical problems had to be overcome before the record was achieved, with the vessel finally making the return to Sagunto, Spain after just under 61 days on 27 June 2008.

In late 2009, it was announced that the boat, now repainted black and named Ady Gil, would be participating in anti-whaling operations under the lead of the Sea Shepherd Conservation Society. During operations in the Southern Ocean, the vessel and the Japanese whaling support vessel MV Shōnan Maru 2 collided on 6 January 2010, resulting in loss of the Ady Gil's bow and injuring one crew member. Each side blamed the other for causing the collision, and government agencies began an investigation into the incident. The crew of the Ady Gil were removed from the damaged vessel and the salvage operation was abandoned, with the vessel sinking the next day.

== Design ==
The vessel was designed by LOMOcean Marine (formerly Craig Loomes Design Group Ltd.) and built by Calibre Boats in Auckland, New Zealand. The wave-piercing trimaran design allowed for improved speed and stability. The boat was fully submersible, able to cut through 15-metre (49 ft) waves and go 7 m (23 ft) underwater. The hull was composed of a composite carbon fibre and kevlar with a non-toxic anti-fouling paint.

The vessel was powered by two 540 horsepower Cummins Mercruiser engines that ran on an animal fat and vegetable oil mix biodiesel. It could be run on diesel, biodiesel or blends. To cool and provide fresh air to the engines, intakes were located on two dramatic fins. The Ady Gil's twin propellers were mounted under the main hull, while the rudders were mounted in the pontoons. This design provided good turning at speed, but limited maneuverability at speeds below 12 knots. Despite its design as an "eco-boat", Sir David MacKay calculated that it had significantly greater energy consumption per passenger-kilometre than a jet-ski or the QE2.

The $2.5 million cost was mostly funded by sponsors, and the only luxury item aboard was the $10,000 toilet. When asked, "Regrets about the cost of it all?" skipper Pete Bethune replied, "No ... You know, I do have the coolest boat in the world."

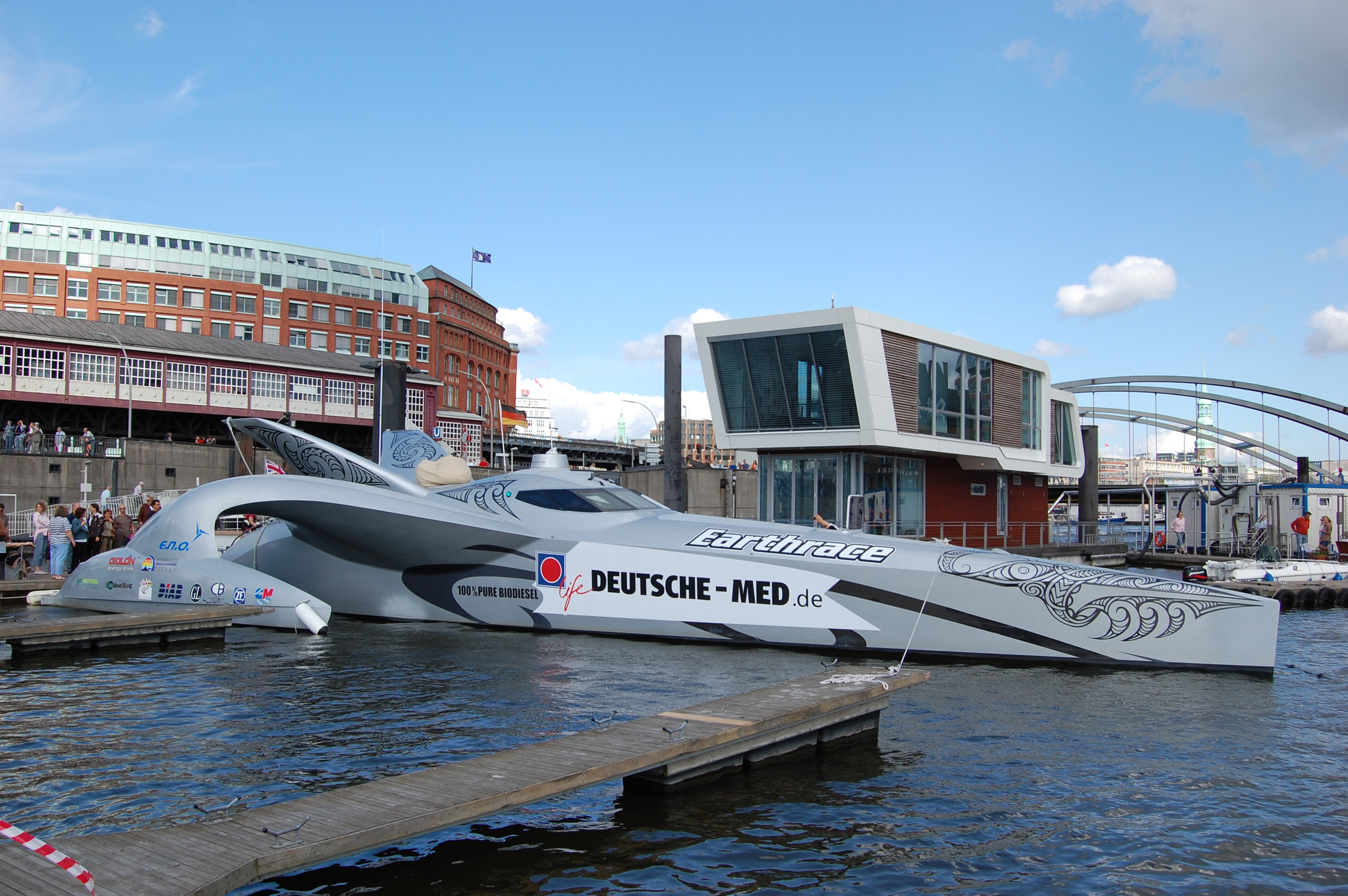
As Earthrace in Hamburg, Germany 2007.

== Record attempts ==
Earthrace was intended to showcase environmentally friendly technologies. It broke the world record for circumnavigating the globe in a motorised boat. It set the record in 60 days 23 hours and 49 minutes. This beat the record of 74 days, 20 hours, 58 minutes set by the Cable and Wireless Adventurer (then the Ocean 7 Adventurer), in 1998, by 13 days 21 hours and 9 minutes. It is unclear if the circumnavigation was faster than the disputed time set by the US Navy's USS Triton nuclear-powered submarine during Operation Sandblast. The time established by Earthrace did not supersede the overall record set by the 103-ft sailing trimaran Groupama 3 skipped by Franck Cammas with 48d 7h 44' 52" or the latest 2012 record set by Banque Populaire V, a 131-ft trimaran skipped by Loïck Peyron, with 45d 13h 42' 53".

=== 2007 ===
The attempt originally departed from Barbados on 10 March 2007 but encountered significant delays including problems with the propellers and other mechanical issues.

A problem with an engine off Palau caused an 8-day delay because of the remoteness. On the night of 19 March 2007, while around 22 kilometres (14 mi) offshore from Guatemala, Earthrace collided with a local fishing boat. No Earthrace crew were hurt, but one of the three crew members from the fishing boat was never found. The crew was absolved of any responsibility after a 10-day investigation during which they were held in custody. The delays prevented Earthrace from completing the circumnavigation in record time, but because Earthrace took an official start time when leaving San Diego, the team decided to "restart" with this new start/finish line. They departed San Diego on 7 April 2007 and needed to return by 21 June to break the record. However, the attempt was abandoned on 31 May 2007 after a crack was discovered in the hull shortly after leaving Málaga, Spain.

The biofuel came from a wide range of suppliers and was derived from various cash crops. Bethune reluctantly had to fall back on conventional diesel once due to a lack of availability.

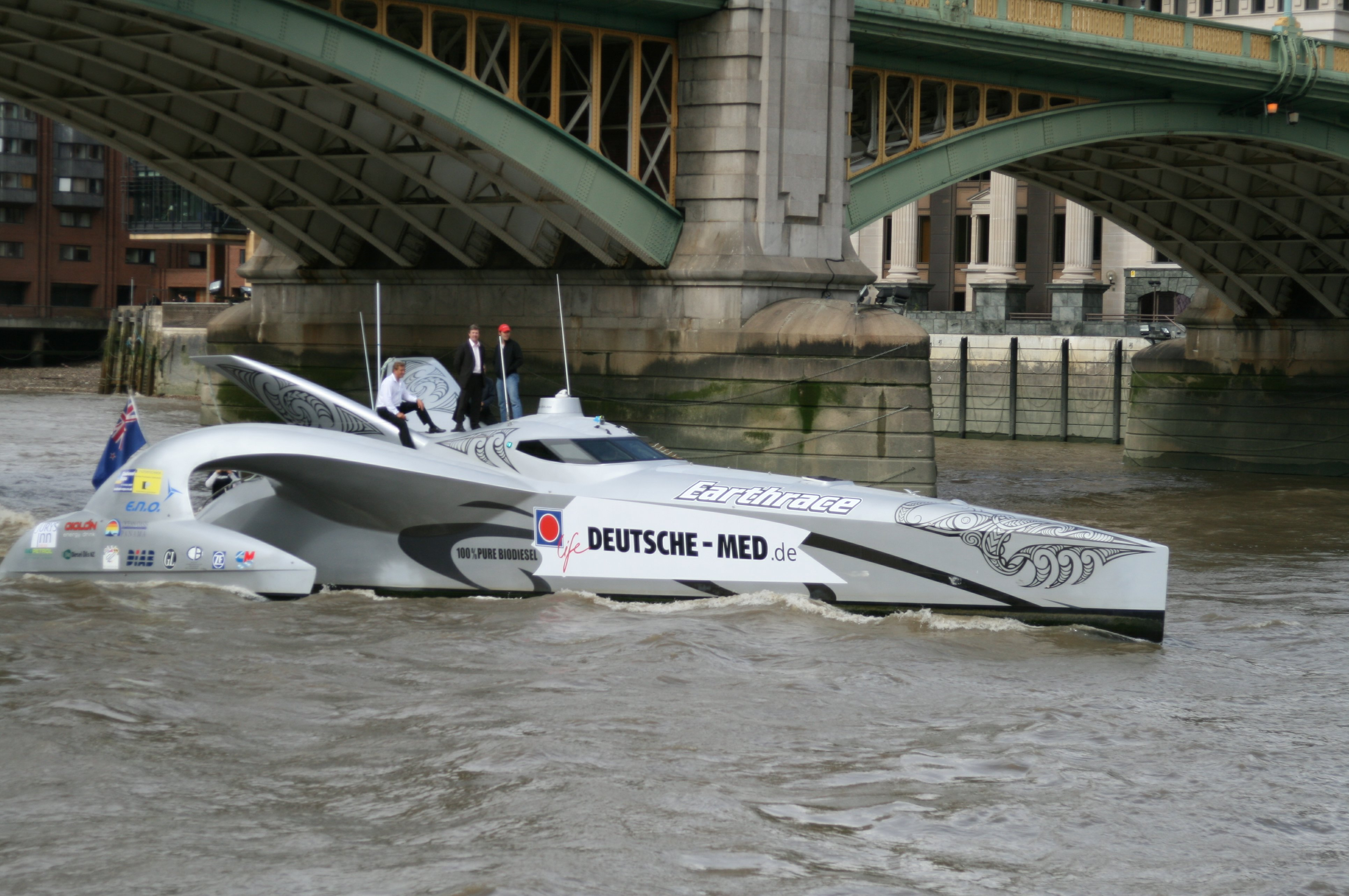
The Earthrace on the River Thames, London.

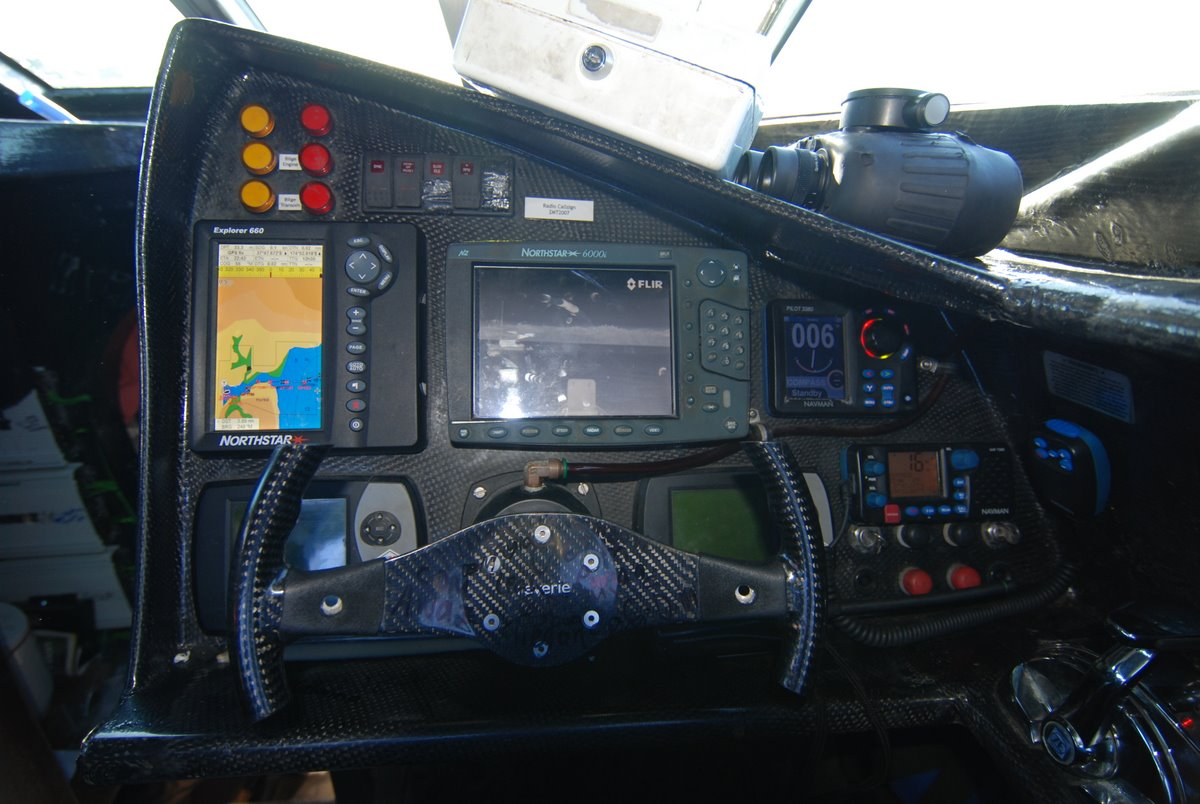
Cockpit of the Earthrace.

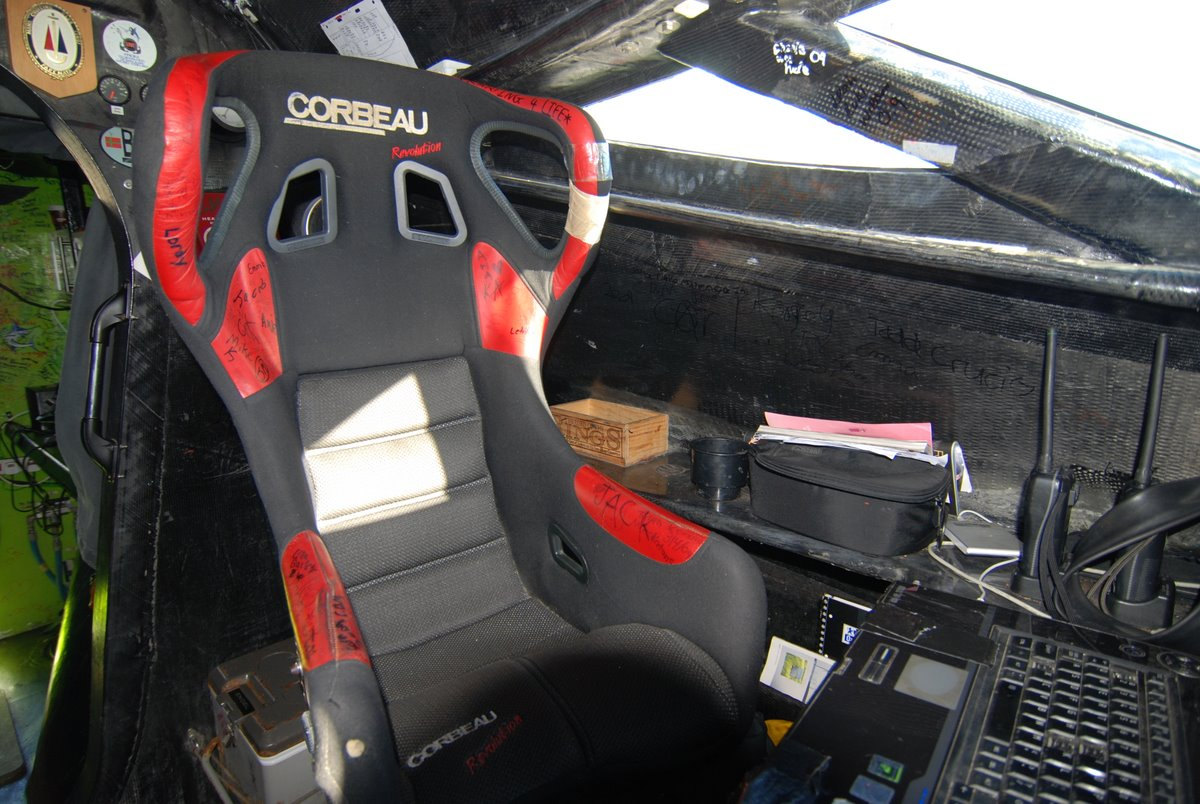
A view of the skippers seat.

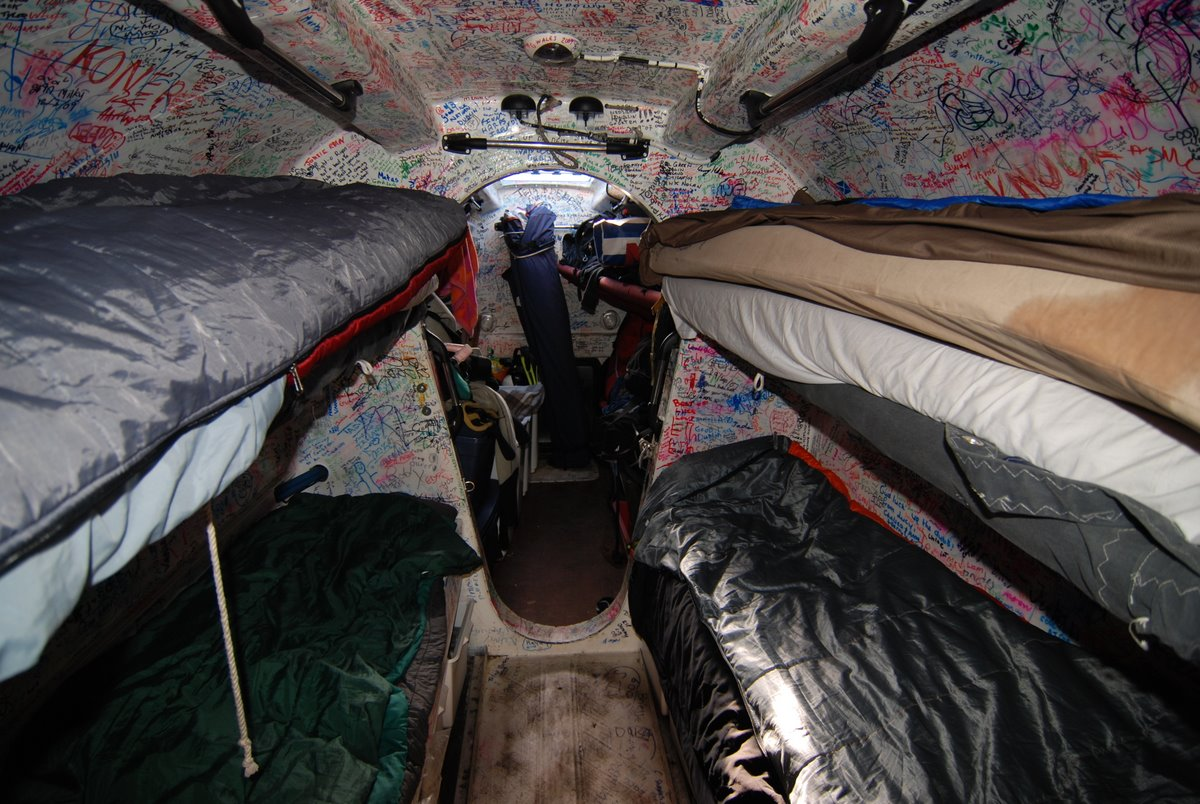
The crew rest area with eight bunk beds.

=== 2008 ===
After a refit at the Vulkan Shipyard at the Port of Sagunto, a second attempt on the record began at 14:35 (CET) on 27 April 2008. On board were Rob Drewett (cameraman), Adam Carlson (navigator), Mark Russel (engineer) and Bethune (skipper/owner). The route for the second world record attempt and estimated time for each leg was as follows:

- Sagunto (Spain) – Azores: 3 days
- Azores – Puerto Rico: 3 days
- Puerto Rico – Panama: 3 days
- Panama – Manzanillo (Mexico): 3 days
- Manzanillo – San Diego: 3 days.
- San Diego – Hawaii: 5 days
- Hawaii – Majuro (Marshall Islands): 5 days
- Majuro – Koror (Palau): 5 days
- Koror – Singapore: 5 days
- Singapore – Kochi (India): 5 days
- Kochi – Salalah (Oman): 4 days
- Salalah – Suez Canal (Egypt): 4 days
- Suez Canal – Sagunto: 4 days

The boat experienced problems with the autopilot two days after departure, and then on 30 April the lift pump of the starboard engine became blocked. However, although some time was lost, the boat arrived at the Azores slightly ahead of schedule for the world record attempt and with all technical problems apparently solved.

The next two legs went without any major problems and the crew managed to bypass a big backlog of ships in the Panama Canal. On day 22 about halfway to Hawaii, a severe vibration caused them to stop and after Bethune went under the boat in the dark with a torch to investigate, he discovered that some nylon netting was entangled in one prop and had to be removed.

Shortly after leaving Palau on day 34, Earthrace struck submerged debris which sheared two blades off the port propeller and bent the drive shaft. This necessitated a return to Palau in order to assess the damage and remove the prop. The boat then continued to Singapore on one engine, while plans were set in motion to manufacture a new drive shaft and obtain another propeller. Once in Singapore, Earthrace was hoisted from the water in a sling and repairs were effected on the dockside in record time.

On day 48 the crew were suffering from heat and high humidity and were all affected by heat rash. At this time they had also encountered monsoon weather and their speed was much reduced due to mountainous waves. The heavy seas continued all the way to Oman and beyond before entering the Red Sea. During this stretch the boat's transponder was damaged and the marine tracker stopped working. On day 56, en route to Port Suez, the lift pump malfunctioned, limiting their speed to 16 knots. This required three hours worth of maintenance to change it.

On Friday, 27 June 2008, Earthrace set a new world record for powered circumnavigation of the globe, when it crossed the finish line at 14:24 CET at Sagunto, Spain.

== Cooperation with Sea Shepherd Conservation Society ==
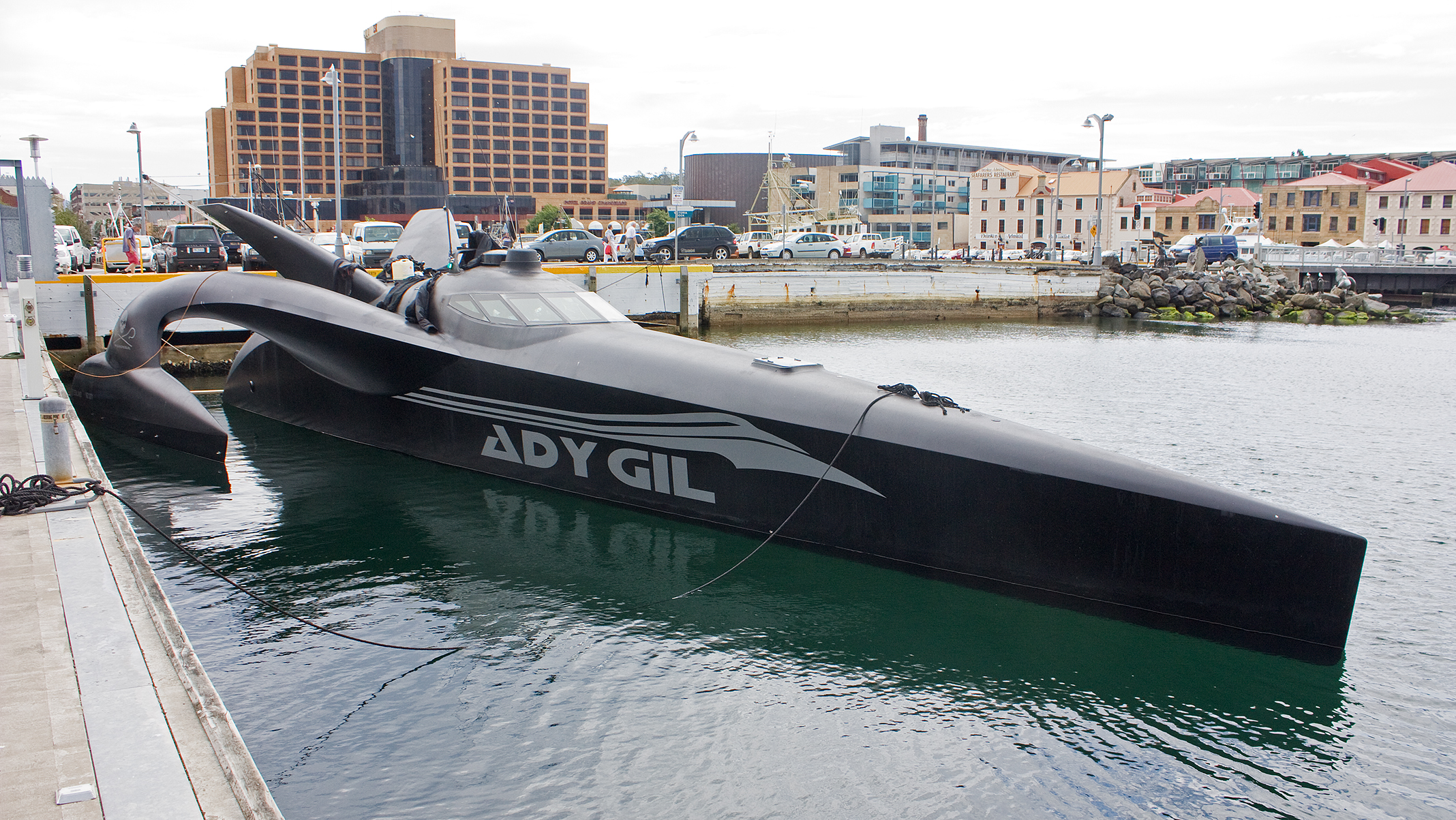
As the Ady Gil, docked for repairs in Hobart, Tasmania in late 2009, with the new black paint job evoking a 'stealth design', backed by special radar-scattering paint.

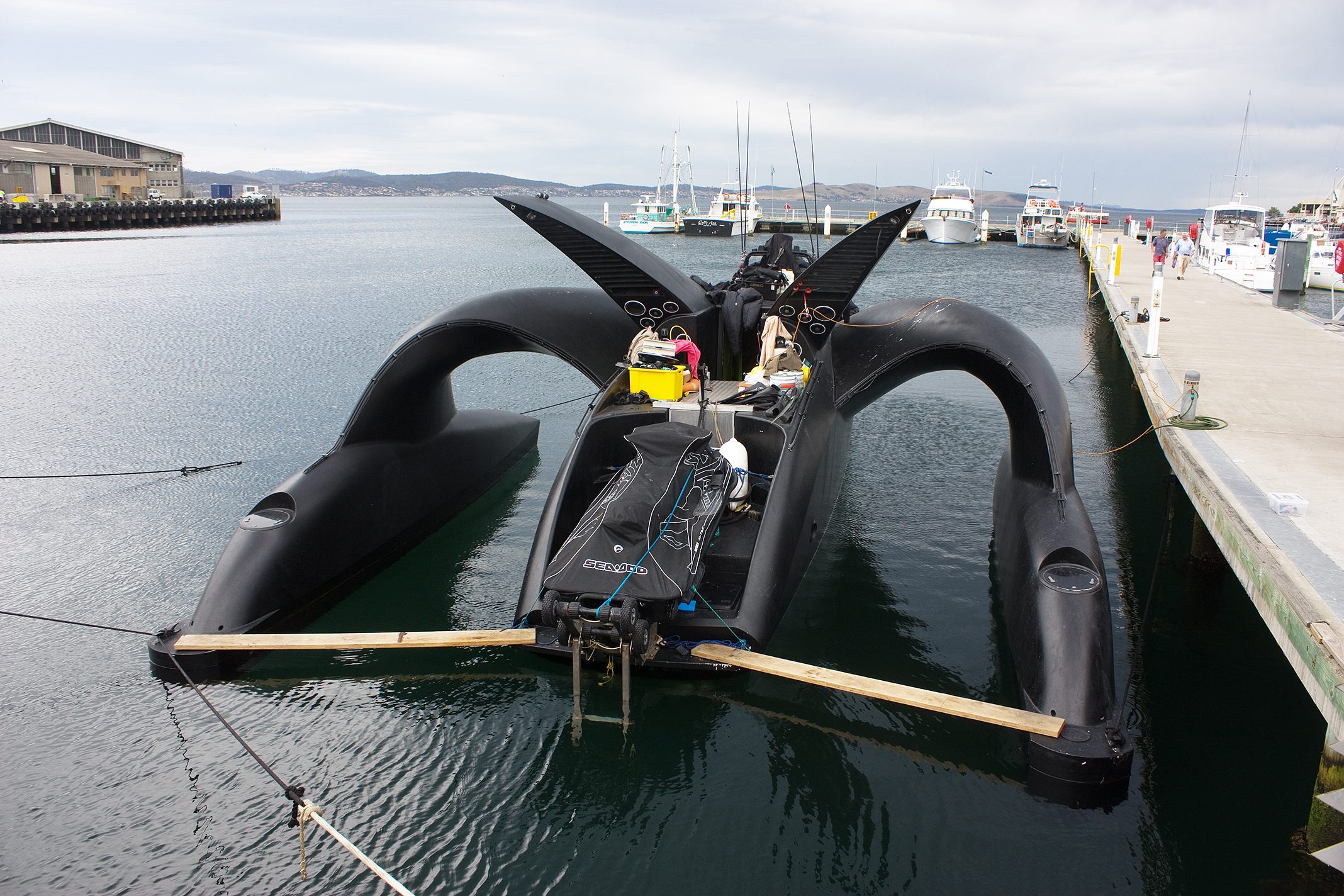
Rear of the Ady Gil.

=== Participation in 'Waltzing Matilda' ===
It was announced that the Earthrace would accompany Sea Shepherd in its 2009–10 operations (named 'Waltzing Matilda') against Japanese whaling in the Southern Ocean Whale Sanctuary. Bethune said that an agreement was reached with Sea Shepherd for the boat to adopt a support role. Sea Shepherd noted that the vessel had been the only one in the fleet fast enough to keep up with all vessels of the Japanese whaling fleet.

On 17 October 2009, the Earthrace was presented to the media with a new black paint job, and it was renamed Ady Gil, after the name of a major sponsor (a Hollywood lighting-equipment magnate who had donated $1 million to the group). The new paint job and futuristic appearance of the boat itself often evoked comparisons to Batman vehicles and stealth craft in the media.

4–8 layers of Kevlar were added to protect the hull against ice with the thickness depending on the location, with all areas under the waterline getting the extra laminations of kevlar as well as some areas above the waterline. To reduce its radar profile for the Japanese fleet, the ship was painted with a paint intended to scatter radar signals and a broadband radar which has near-zero radar emissions. Despite being referred to as a stealth craft, the Ady Gil lacks the angles and curvature of form designed to deflect radar away from the emitter rather than back to them. Other electronics upgrades included FLIR cameras, Iridium satellite communications as well as an array of speakers which were intended for communication purposes. Bethune said that he intended to play songs like Tangaroa from New Zealand musician Tiki Taane to the whalers, a "growling big sort of a song about the God of the Sea who looks after us".

Sea Shepherd crew said before the journey that Ady Gil would not be used as a confrontational vessel like the Steve Irwin. However, Sea Shepherd leader Paul Watson, President of the Sea Shepherd Conservation Society, later stated in October 2009 that with a top speed of 50 knots, the vessel would be used to intercept harpoon ships and physically block them from harpooning whales, allowing Sea Shepherd to "mount the most ambitious and aggressive effort to date to obstruct the slaughter of the whales in the Southern Ocean."

=== Collision with the Shōnan Maru 2 and abandonment ===
During the days before the collision, the Ady Gil engaged Japanese whaling vessels during their hunt. The crew towed ropes in an attempt to foul the propellers of the Japanese ships and used a potato cannon to fire capsules of foul-smelling butyric acid which taints the whale meat the whalers get from their hunts.

On 6 January 2010, the vessel was involved in a collision at sea with the Japanese vessel Shōnan Maru 2, which was engaged in security and support for the whaling fleet. One Ady Gil crew member, a New Zealand cameraman, sustained six broken ribs. Crew on three vessels, the Shōnan Maru 2, the Ady Gil, and the MY Bob Barker, a Sea Shepherd Conservation Society support ship, took footage of the incident, and video of the incident has been released by both the Institute of Cetacean Research and the Sea Shepherd Conservation Society.

Each side blames the other for the incident, arguing that the skipper of the other vessel miscalculated during a dangerous maneuver. Bethune has said that he believes the captain of the Japanese vessel had miscalculated while trying to scrape the bow of the Ady Gil. In a statement released by the Sea Shepherd Conservation Society, Chuck Swift, who witnessed the incident from his ship, the Bob Barker, claimed that both vessels were stationary in the water when the Shōnan Maru 2 "started up and then steered deliberately into the Ady Gil". Paul Watson initially claimed that the Ady Gil was almost stationary in the water when the Shōnan Maru 2 suddenly changed course and then steered deliberately into it. However, Watson later stated that "One only needs to watch the video to see that Bethune negligently stopped his ship in the path of the whaling vessel and it was cut in half". Japan's Institute of Cetacean Research blames the collision on Sea Shepherd, who they say were attempting to entangle their rudder and propeller by repeatedly crossing their bow with lines. The Japanese Fisheries Agency said that the Shōnan Maru 2 had employed a water cannon to deter the Ady Gil, but the anti-whaling vessel undertook manoeuvres like suddenly reducing speed, resulting in the collision. Opinions in news media organisations vary similarly. Some blame the Ady Gil for powering up to intentionally propel itself into the whaler's path, some accuse the Shōnan Maru 2 of intentionally ramming a stationary vessel – with both sides basing their views primarily on the released video footage. Others place the blame more evenly. An investigation into the collision by the Australian Maritime Safety Authority (AMSA) was inconclusive and unable to assign blame for the collision. AMSA was unable to verify claims made by Sea Shepherd, while the Japanese government declined to participate with the investigation saying any information it had might be needed for an inquiry by its own authorities. New Zealand authorities found both parties were at fault for the collision. The inquiry by Maritime New Zealand found that the Shonan Maru No. 2 should have kept clear of the Ady Gil under international collision regulations, and had ample opportunity to avoid hitting it. It also found that the Ady Gil failed to take avoiding action, and its helmsman did not see the Japanese ship bearing down until seconds before the impact.

The Institute discovered the wreck of the Ady Gil and released video footage reportedly showing it to be leaking diesel fuel into the Southern Ocean. It also recovered a number of large-size arrows floating near the wreck, arguing that these proved Sea Shepherd was willing to endanger human life with their tactics. The crew of the Ady Gil claim the arrows were to be used for shooting the dead whales, poisoning their flesh and causing the whale to be of no use to the whalers and statements to this effect were made during filming for an episode of Whale Wars. The discovery of the arrows was later used by Sea Shepherd to justify the expulsion of Bethune from the Sea Shepherd organisation.

Having sustained severe damage, Ady Gil was towed towards the French Dumont d'Urville Station in Antarctica. While weather conditions had been reported as favourable for the salvage attempt, the process of towing the vessel was reported to have caused it to take on more water. Sea Shepherd claimed that all fuel and oil had been taken off-board the drifting vessel, at risk to the crew. However, Japanese sources later provided photographs allegedly showing the abandoned wreckage to be leaking diesel fuel into the Southern Ocean.

Bethune posted an open letter to his Facebook page on 6 October 2010, in which he said that after colliding with the Shōnan Maru 2, Watson directed him to deliberately sink the Ady Gil for PR purposes.

On 7 January 2013, Watson was sued in Los Angeles County by the owner of the boat for $5 million. Gil says his vessel was rammed by a Japanese whaling ship in 2010 and suffered damage to the nose but the damage was repairable. According to Gil, Watson saw the collision as an opportunity to spin the incident into a major publicity and money maker for his organisation so instead of towing the boat to port for repairs, he secretly gave an order to sink the ship "under the cover of darkness" and blamed the Japanese. Gil claims Watson knew that blaming the whalers for the destruction of his ship would garner sympathy for his cause and spark outrage against the whalers inspiring more people to donate to his anti-whaling organisation. Bethune also took Sea Shepherd to arbitration court for the balance owed to him in the amount of $500,000.

A complaint based on the Racketeer Influenced and Corrupt Organizations (RICO) Act was filed by Ady Gil and Vince Dundee against Sea Shepherd and Paul Watson on 6 August 2014 in the Superior Court of Los Angeles regarding the solicitation of donations for a replacement for the vessel.

In September 2015, an arbitrator ruled that Sea Shepherd intentionally and wrongfully scuttled the MV Ady Gil, intending to capitalise on the publicity the sinking would bring. Sea Shepherd fought to have the ruling and award kept from the public, but was ultimately unsuccessful. In January 2016, it accepted the arbitrator's ruling, which once finalised will see the arbitration award made public. Mr Gil and Earthrace Ltd were awarded US$500,000 in compensation plus 3.25% interest on that amount from 8 January 2010 to 15 September 2015, the date of the arbitrator's order.

=== Bethune's detention and arrest ===
Bethune boarded the Shōnan Maru 2 on 15 February 2010, claiming to be conducting a citizen's arrest of her captain for what he said was the attempted murder of him and his crew, and to present a $3 million demand for his lost boat. He was detained by the ship's crew and taken to Japan, where he was arrested by the Japanese Coast Guard on 12 March on charges of trespassing. On 2 April 2010, Bethune was indicted on five charges; trespassing, assault, illegal possession of a knife, destruction of property and obstruction of business. He was held without bond in a maximum security prison for five months. In July 2010 Bethune was sentenced to two years in prison, but received a five-year suspension of sentence and was deported back to New Zealand. Bethune was also seemingly expelled from Sea Shepherd in response to bringing a set of bow and arrows on board with intent of spoiling whale meat for commercial use; however, Watson later said this was a legal strategy on the part of Sea Shepherd during Bethune's trial.

=== Replacement ===
The financial loss of the Ady Gil was estimated at $1.5 million. A donor had reportedly offered $1 million towards the construction of the Ady Gil 2. Sea Shepherd instead acquired the Ocean 7 Adventurer (which is the vessel that held the race record until the Ady Gil beat it) to replace the Ady Gil for its 2011 campaign against Japanese whaling in the Antarctic and renamed it MV Gojira (Godzilla), then later, MV Brigitte Bardot.

== See also ==
- List of circumnavigations
