= Nigg Rock =

Insular rock in the South Orkney Islands

Nigg Rock (60°43′S 44°51′W) is an insular rock, 165 m (510 ft) high, lying 0.5 nautical miles (0.9 km) northwest of Route Point, the northwest tip of Laurie Island in the South Orkney Islands. It is between the Mackenzie Peninsula (named after the family of Jessie Mackenzie), and Eillium Island (named after their son, born 1902).

First seen and roughly charted by Captain George Powell and Captain Nathaniel Palmer on the occasion of their joint cruise in 1821. Recharted in 1903 by the Scottish National Antarctic Expedition under William S. Bruce, who named it for the birthplace of his wife, Nigg Bay in Cromarty in Scotland.
