= Ailsa Craig (South Orkney Islands) =

Island in the South Orkney Islands

Coordinates: 60°47′S 44°37′W

Location of Ailsa Craig in the South Orkney Islands.

Ailsa Craig is a precipitous island 1 mile (2 km) south of Point Rae, off the south coast of Laurie Island in the South Orkney Islands. Charted in 1903 by the Scottish National Antarctic Expedition under William Speirs Bruce, who named it for the island in the Firth of Clyde in Scotland.
