= Harvey Pirie =

British bacteriologist and philatelist (1878–1965)

James Hunter Harvey Pirie
- Born: 10 December 1878
- Died: 27 September 1965 (aged 86)

Dr James Hunter Harvey Pirie FRSE FRCPE (10 December 1878 – 27 September 1965) was a 20th-century British medical doctor, philatelist, orchid-grower and bacteriologist. Pirie named the bacterial genus Listeria in honor of Joseph Lister and the Pirie Peninsula is named after him. Cape Mabel was named after his wife. In authorship he is known as J. H. H. Pirie.

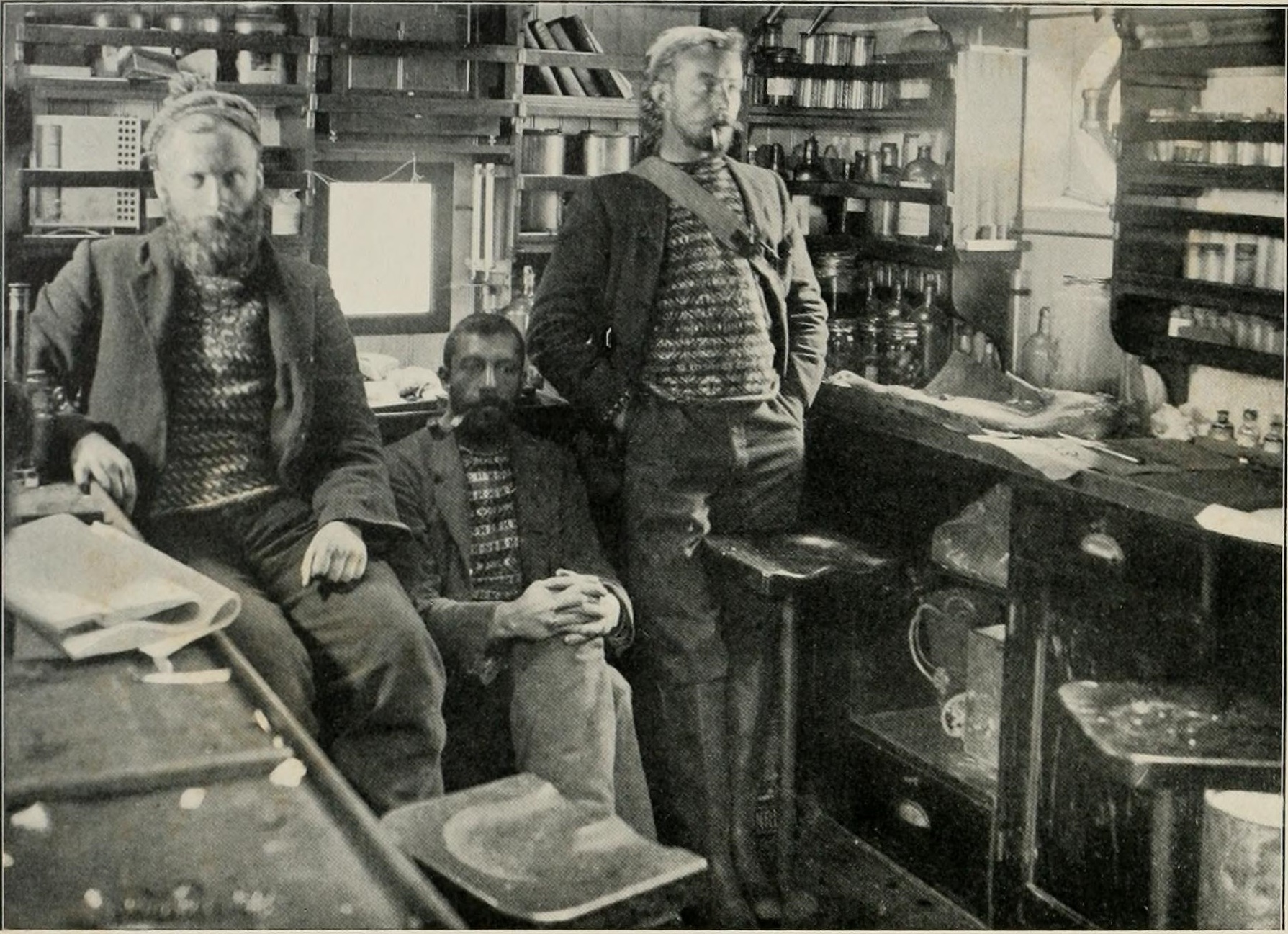
Pirie (right) with fellow naturalists aboard the Scotia during the Scottish National Antarctic Expedition

== Life ==
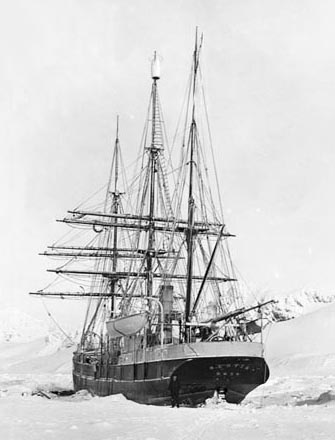
Scotia, anchored at Laurie Island in 1903

He was born in Glasgow the son of Dr John Pirie of 26 Elmbank Crescent.

Pirie was commissioned into the Royal Field Artillery as a second lieutenant on 28 March 1900, but resigned from the military later the same year. He earned his first medical degree at Glasgow University graduating MB ChB in 1902. From 1902 until 1904 he participated in the Scottish National Antarctic Expedition on the ex-whaling ship Scotia, under William Speirs Bruce, Pirie acting as both surgeon and geologist. This involved spending the majority of 1903 on a makeshift base on the South Orkney Islands. He went on to postgraduate studies at the University of Edinburgh and was awarded his doctorate (MD) in 1907 after producing his thesis - 'On the smaller polygonal cells of the grey matter of the spinal cord'.

In 1908 he was elected a Fellow of the Royal Society of Edinburgh. His proposers were Daniel John Cunningham, Alexander Bruce, Henry Harvey Littlejohn, and David Waterston.

He later worked in a private medical practice in Scotland. In 1913, he joined the Colonial Medical Service in Kenya as a bacteriologist and he became deputy director at the South African Institute for Medical Research in Johannesburg from 1926 till 1941.

== Philately ==
Pirie was a noted philatelist with a specialism in the philately of the polar regions. He was Editor of the South African Philatelist for thirty-six years, and wrote important works on the stamps of Swaziland and the New Republic. He signed the Roll of Distinguished Philatelists in 1948 and in the same year, the Roll of Distinguished Philatelists of South Africa.

== Publications ==
- The Voyage of the Scotia, being a record of a voyage of exploration in the Antarctic Seas by Robert Mossman, James Hunter Harvey Pirie, and Robert Neal Rudmose-Brown, C. Hurst London (1906)
- Medical Jurisprudence (1911)

== See also ==
- Cynomacrurus piriei, a fish named after Pirie

== References and sources ==
Sources

- Bernstein RE (1983). "Dr Harvey Pirie and the Scottish National Antarctic Expedition (1902-4). Scottish science and medicine in the Falklands and Antarctica". Scott Med J. 28 (1): 75–9. doi:10.1177/003693308302800117. PMID 6340196. S2CID 12173063.
- James Hunter Harvey Pirie collection.
- Brief biography of his wife Mabel.
