= Bruce Islands =

Group of islands and rocks in the South Orkney Islands

Coordinates: 60°41′S 44°54′W

The Bruce Islands are a group of small islands and rocks 1.5 nautical miles (3 km) northwest of Eillium Island and 3 nautical miles (6 km) northwest of Route Point, the northwest tip of Laurie Island, in the South Orkney Islands. They were first roughly shown on Powell's chart resulting from the joint cruise of Captain George Powell and Captain Nathaniel Palmer in 1821. They were remapped in 1912–13 by Captain Petter Sorlle, and in 1933 by Discovery Investigations personnel on the RSS Discovery II, who named them for William S. Bruce, the leader of the Scottish National Antarctic Expedition, 1902–04.

== See also ==
- List of antarctic and sub-antarctic islands
