= Acuña Island =

Antarctic island in the South Orkneys

- Location within Antarctica

Geography
- Location: Antarctica
- Coordinates: 60°46′S 44°37′W
- Archipelago: South Orkney Islands

Administration
- Administered under the Antarctic Treaty System

Demographics
- Population: Uninhabited

Acuña Island, is a small island which lies 0.4 kilometres (0.2 nmi) south of Point Rae, off the south coast of Laurie Island in the South Orkney Islands. Charted in 1903 by the Scottish National Antarctic Expedition under William Speirs Bruce, who named it after Hugo A. Acuña, pioneer Argentine meteorologist at the South Orkney station during 1904.

== See also ==
- Composite Gazetteer of Antarctica – Authoritative international gazetteer containing all the Antarctic toponyms
- List of Antarctic and subantarctic islands
- Scientific Committee on Antarctic Research – British organization
- Territorial claims in Antarctica
