= Mossman Peninsula =

Peninsula in the South Orkney Islands of Antarctica

Coordinates: 60°46′S 44°43′W

Mossman Peninsula is a narrow peninsula 3 nautical miles (6 km) long, extending south from the western part of Laurie Island and separating Scotia Bay and Wilton Bay, in the South Orkney Islands of Antarctica. Point Martin lies on the eastern side of the peninsula. It was first discovered in December 1821 by British sealer Captain George Powell and American sealer Captain Nathaniel Palmer during their joint exploration of the South Orkney Islands. Powell's map, published in 1822, provided the earliest rough charting of the area.

The peninsula was later surveyed in 1903 by the Scottish National Antarctic Expedition, led by William Speirs Bruce. During the expedition, it was named in honor of Robert C. Mossman, the expedition's meteorologist, who conducted detailed studies of the region's climate and atmospheric conditions.

== Geography and Features ==
Mossman Peninsula's rugged terrain is characterized by rocky outcrops and ice-covered areas, typical of the Antarctic environment. The peninsula is largely uninhabited, with its remote location and harsh weather conditions limiting human activity to scientific research. Point Martin provides a notable landmark for navigation and mapping.

The surrounding waters, including Scotia Bay and Wilton Bay, are frequented by a variety of marine wildlife, such as seals and penguins. These bays are often used as safe anchorages during Antarctic expeditions.
