= Rudmose Rocks =

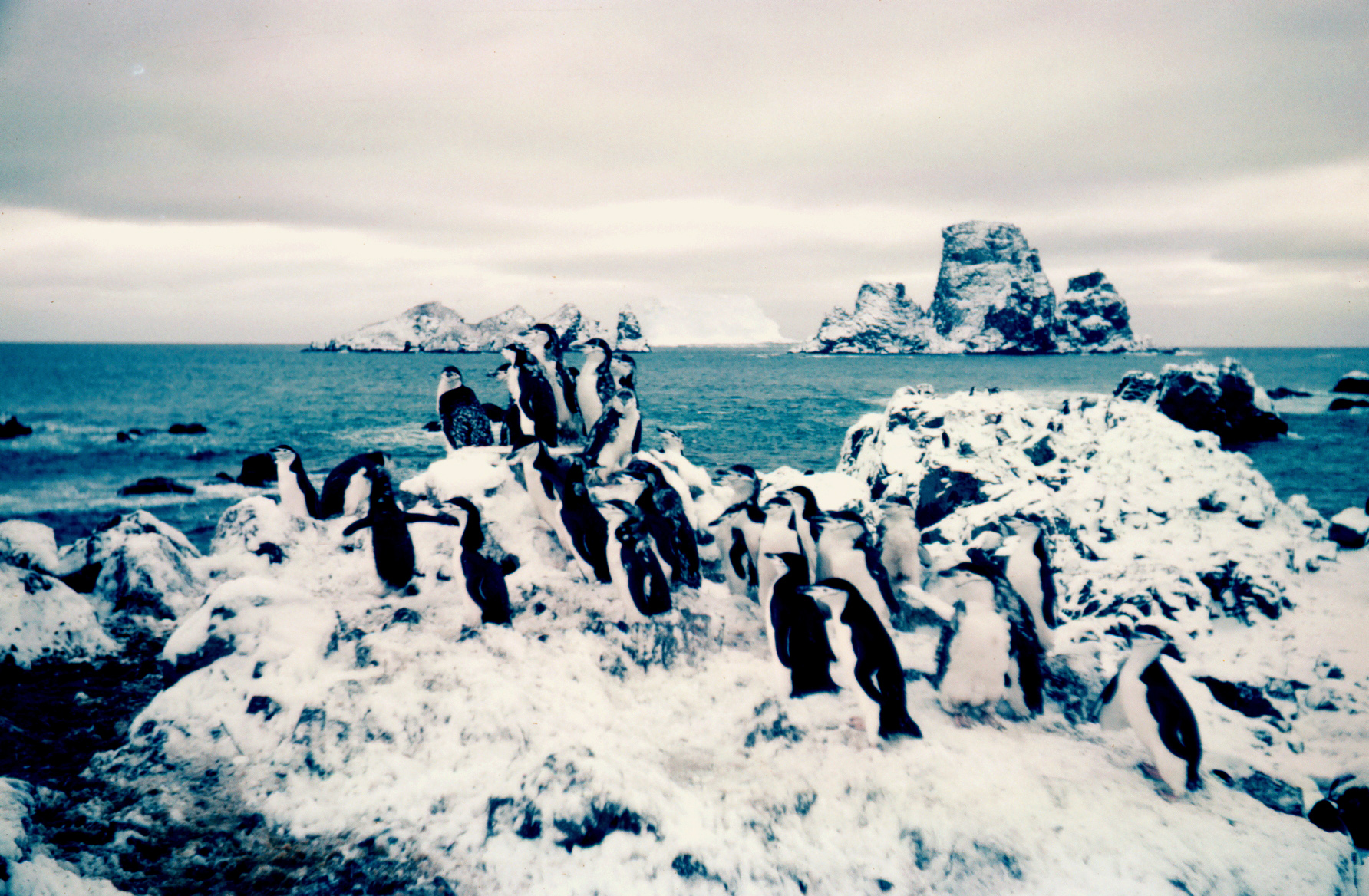
1962 photograph of Cape Geddes, showing Chinstrap Penguins, with Rudmose Rocks in the background

Rudmose Rocks (60°40′33.5″S 44°36′05.7″W) is a group of rocks 0.4 nautical miles (800 meters) north-northwest of Cape Geddes, off the north coast of Laurie Island in the South Orkney Islands. The rocks were charted in 1903 by the Scottish National Antarctic Expedition under William Speirs Bruce, who named them for Robert Neal Rudmose-Brown, naturalist of the expedition.
