= Point Davis =

Point Davis (60°46′S 44°39′W) is a point 1.2 nautical miles (2.2 km) west-northwest of Point Rae on the north side of Scotia Bay, Laurie Island, in the South Orkney Islands. Charted in 1903 by the Scottish National Antarctic Expedition under Bruce, who named it for W.G. Davis, Director of the Argentine Meteorological Office.
