= Mount Ramsay =

Mountain in the South Orkney Islands

Mount Ramsay (60°45′S 44°45′W) is a peak, 475 m, standing at the west side of Uruguay Cove on the north coast of Laurie Island, in the South Orkney Islands. Charted by the Scottish National Antarctic Expedition under Bruce, 1902–04, and named for Allan Ramsay, chief engineer of the expedition ship Scotia, who died on August 6, 1903, and was buried at the foot of the peak.
