= Cape Mabel =

Headland in the South Orkney Islands, Antarctica

- Cape
- Coordinates: 60°41′S 44°40′W

Cape Mabel is a headland forming the northern tip of Pirie Peninsula on the north coast of Laurie Island, in the South Orkney Islands, Antarctica.

It was probably first seen by the British sealing expedition under James Weddell, who examined the north coast of Laurie Island in 1823. The cape was charted in 1903 by the Scottish National Antarctic Expedition under William Speirs Bruce, who named it for the wife of J.H. Harvey Pirie, the surgeon-geologist to the expedition.
