= Uruguay Cove =

Location in South Orkney Islands (Antarctic)

Uruguay Cove (60°45′S 44°43′W) is a cove in the west part of Jessie Bay on the north coast of Laurie Island, in the South Orkney Islands. Charted in 1903 by the Scottish National Antarctic Expedition under W.S. Bruce. He named the cove after the Argentine corvette Uruguay, which for many years after 1904 carried relief parties to the Argentine meteorological station near the cove.

== See also ==
- Point Lola
