= Robert Mossman =

British polar explorer (1870–1940)

Robert Cockburn Mossman FRSE (1870–1940) was a British meteorologist and polar explorer who served on the Scottish Antarctic Expedition of 1903/4. He lived at 10 Blackett Place, Edinburgh. See 1881 census.

== Life ==
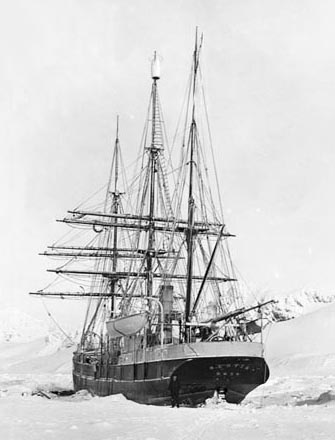
Scotia, anchored at Laurie Island. 1903

He was born on 7 November 1870 to James Mossman, an Edinburgh merchant. The family lived at 10 Panmure Place. Robert was educated at the Royal High School. An early encounter with Alexander Buchan brought about a lifelong interest in meteorology and he began taking private measurements and compiling complex records in 1886 aged only 16.

Although only an amateur he impressed the Edinburgh scientific world sufficiently such that in 1891 he was elected a Fellow of the Royal Society of Edinburgh. Aged only 20 he was one of the youngest ever Fellows. His proposers were Sir John Murray, Alexander Buchan, John McLaren, Lord McLaren and Hugh Robert Mill. He was awarded the Society's Keith Prize for the period 1915–17.

Despite lacking formal training he was a keen amateur meteorologist and was chosen to man the Glen Coe Weather Station at the foot of Ben Nevis in 1895/6. In 1902 he was chosen to join the Scottish National Antarctic Expedition under William Spiers Bruce on board the Scotia alongside the geologist Dr Harvey Pirie. Mossman was asked to man a newly built weather station on Laurie Island on the South Orkneys, named Omond House after Robert Traill Omond. However, the British government declined to accept and maintain the station and it was instead passed to the government of Argentina. Three Argentine meteorologists were collected and delivered to serve under Mossman in February 1904. They remained under his charge until February 1905 when Mossman left them to run the station without him. He then joined the Argentine boat Uruguay going to the Gerlache Strait in Graham Land in search of Dr Charcot's ongoing expedition. After a three-year trip he briefly returned to Britain in 1905 before joining a further expedition, this time to the Arctic regions of Greenland and Spitzbergen 1906/7.

In 1905 the Royal Scottish Geographical Society awarded him their gold medal.

He emigrated to South America and joined the staff of the Argentine Meteorological Office (including the men he had previously worked with).

He died in Buenos Aires on 14 July 1940.

== Publications ==
- Meteorological Phenomena in London with Different Winds 1763-1897 (1898)
- The Height of the Barometer in London (1899)
- Reporting on the Meteorology of Scotland (1899)
- Meteorological Observations taken in Edinburgh (1900)
- The Voyage of the Scotia (1907)
- The Climate of the State of Sao Paulo, Brazil (1919)
- Southern Hemisphere Seasonal Correlations

== Family ==
In 1907 he married Sarah W. Limont, daughter of Rev W, Limont of Alnwick.
