= Point Lola =

Point Lola (60°44′S 44°43′W) is the east entrance point to Uruguay Cove, Laurie Island, in the South Orkney Islands. The name appears on an Argentine government chart of 1930, based upon surveys by two Argentine naval officers, I. Espindola in the Uruguay in 1915 and A. Rodriguez in the Primero de Mayo in 1930.
