= Eillium Island =

Island of Antarctica

Coordinates: 60°42′S 44°51′W

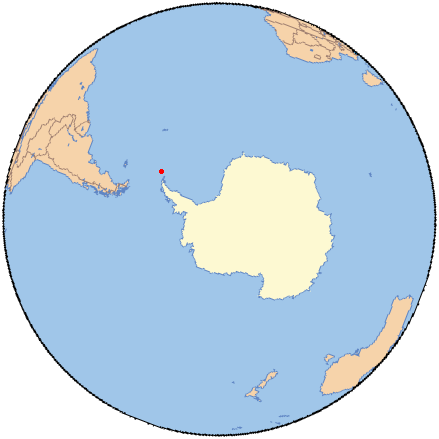
South Orkney Islands

Eillium Island is a small island 2.2 km (1.4 mi) north-west of Rumbo Punta, the north-west tip of Laurie Island in the South Orkney Islands of Antarctica. It was first seen and roughly charted by Captain George Powell and Captain Nathaniel Palmer during their joint cruise in 1821. It was recharted in 1903 by the Scottish National Antarctic Expedition under Dr. William S. Bruce, who named it after his son Eillium.

== Important Bird Area ==
The 57 ha island has been identified as an Important Bird Area (IBA) by BirdLife International because it supports a large breeding colony of about 21,000 pairs of chinstrap penguins.

== See also ==
- List of Antarctic and subantarctic islands
