= Robert Traill Omond =

British meteorologist and physicist

Robert Traill Omond FRSE LLD SMS (1858–1914) was a British physicist, geologist and meteorologist who set up the Ben Nevis Observatory.

== Life ==
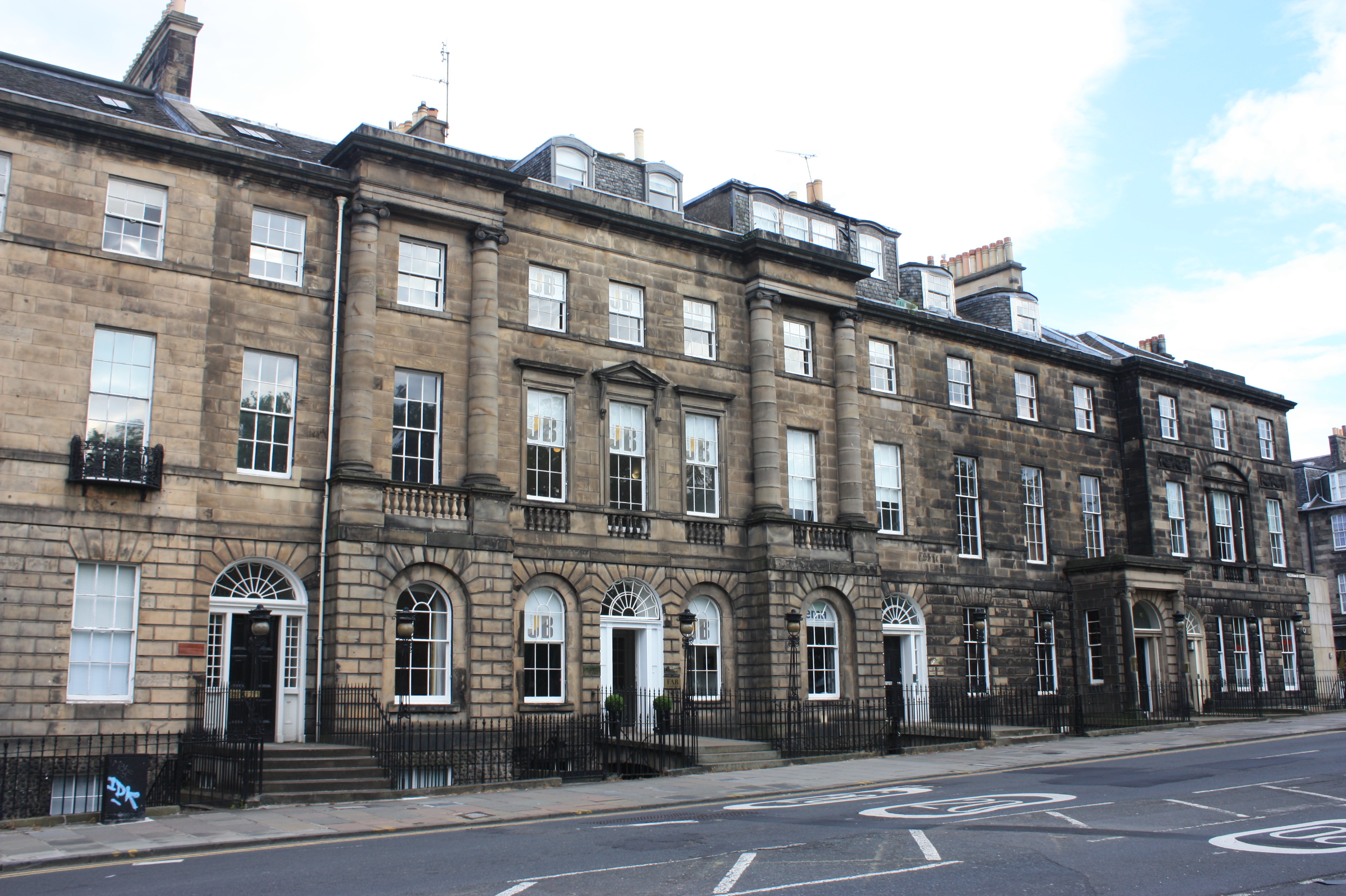
43 Charlotte Square (centre), Birthplace of Robert Traill Omond

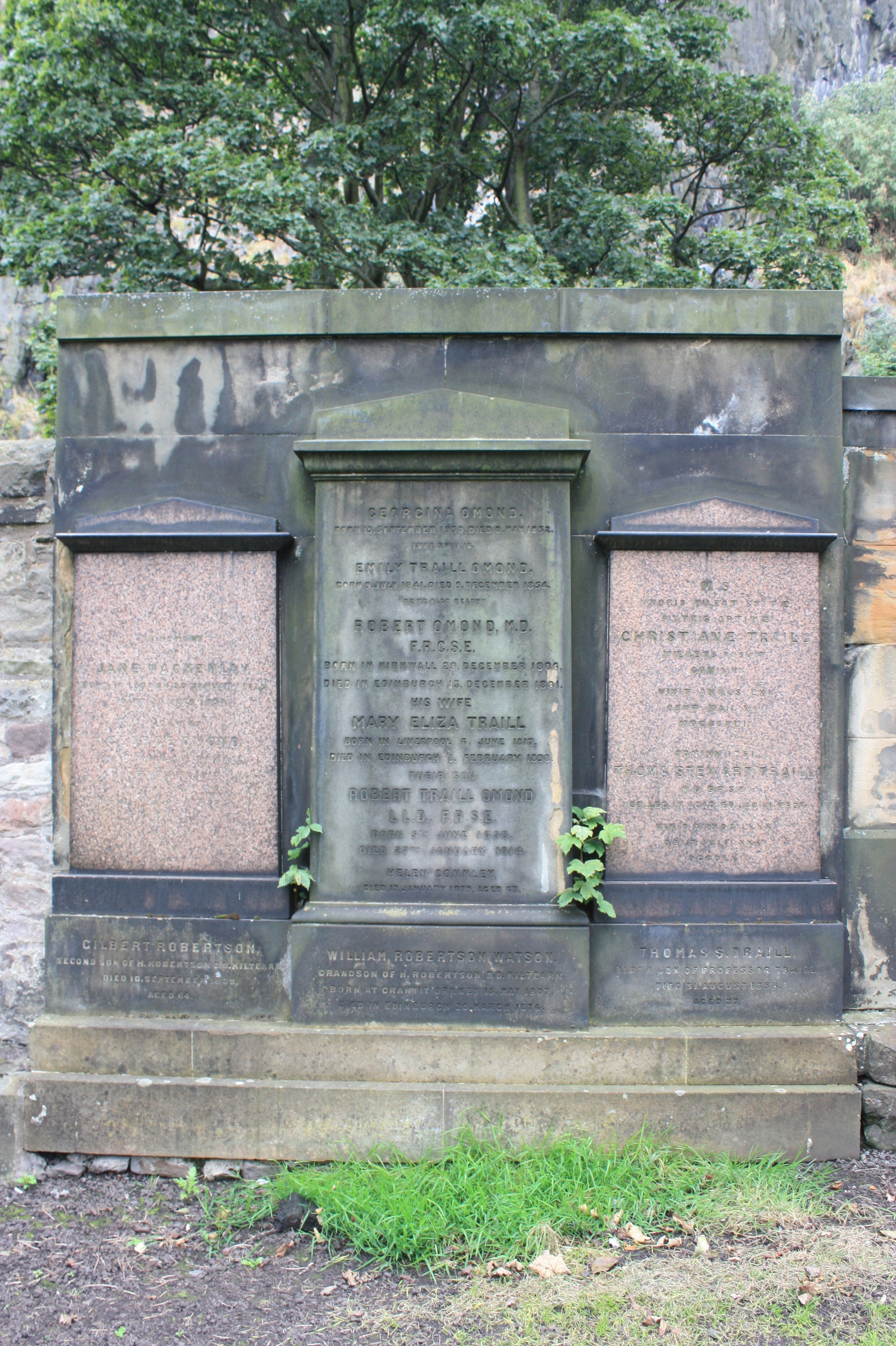
The grave of Robert Traill Omond, St Cuthberts Churchyard, Edinburgh

He was born on 5 June 1858, the son of Mary Eliza Traill, daughter of Thomas Stewart Traill, and Dr Robert Omond (1806–1881) of 43 Charlotte Square in Edinburgh. He was educated at the Collegiate School in Edinburgh then studied science at the University of Edinburgh.

In 1883 he set up an observatory on Ben Nevis and served as its Superintendent 1883 to 1891 and as its honorary superintendent 1891 until death.

In 1884 he was elected a Fellow of the Royal Society of Edinburgh. His proposers were Peter Guthrie Tait, Alexander Crum Brown, Alexander Buchan and Sir John Murray. He was awarded the Society's Keith Prize for the period 1889–1891. The University of Edinburgh awarded him an honorary doctorate (LLD) in 1913.

In later life he lived at 3 Church Hill in the Morningside area of Edinburgh.

He died on 27 January 1914. The entire Traill/Omond family are buried together in the southern section of St Cuthberts Churchyard, immediately below Edinburgh Castle.

== Recognition ==
William Speirs Bruce named the meteorological station in Scotia Bay on Laurie Island Omond House in recognition of him, during his Antarctic expedition of 1902. The building was officially opened on 1 April 1903 and was manned by Robert Mossman until 1905. The British government declined to accept responsibility for the long term maintenance and operation of the weather station and it was instead bought by the government of Argentina in 1906, which has continued to maintain it.
