= Scotia Bay =

Bay in the South Orkney Islands of Antarctica

Coordinates: 60°46′S 44°40′W

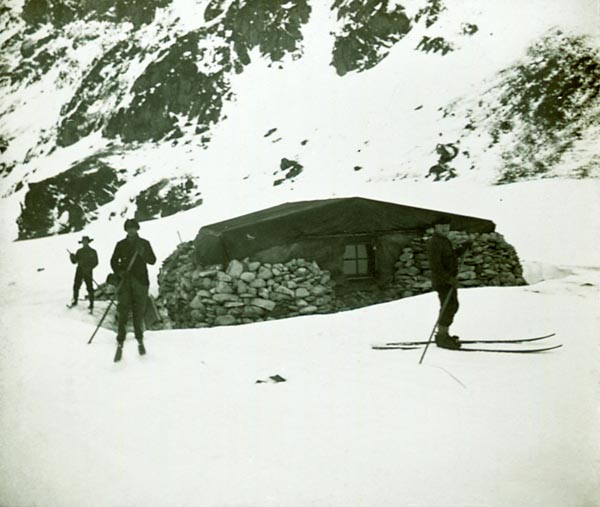
Ormond House, built by the Scottish expedition - 1903 photograph

Scotia Bay is a bay 4 km (2.5 mi) wide, lying immediately east of Mossman Peninsula on the south side of Laurie Island, in the South Orkney Islands of Antarctica. It was discovered and roughly charted in the course of the joint cruise by Captain George Powell and Captain Nathaniel Palmer in 1821. It was surveyed in 1903 by the Scottish National Antarctic Expedition under William Speirs Bruce who named it for the expedition ship Scotia.

== Historic site ==
An area of the bay contains a stone hut built in 1903 by the Scottish expedition and known as Ormond House; an Argentine meteorological hut and magnetic observatory, built in 1905 and known as Moneta House; and a graveyard with twelve graves, the oldest dating from 1903. These have been designated a Historic Site or Monument (HSM 42), following a proposal by Argentina to the Antarctic Treaty Consultative Meeting.
