= Hugh Robert Mill =

British geographer

Hugh Robert Mill FRSE FRGS
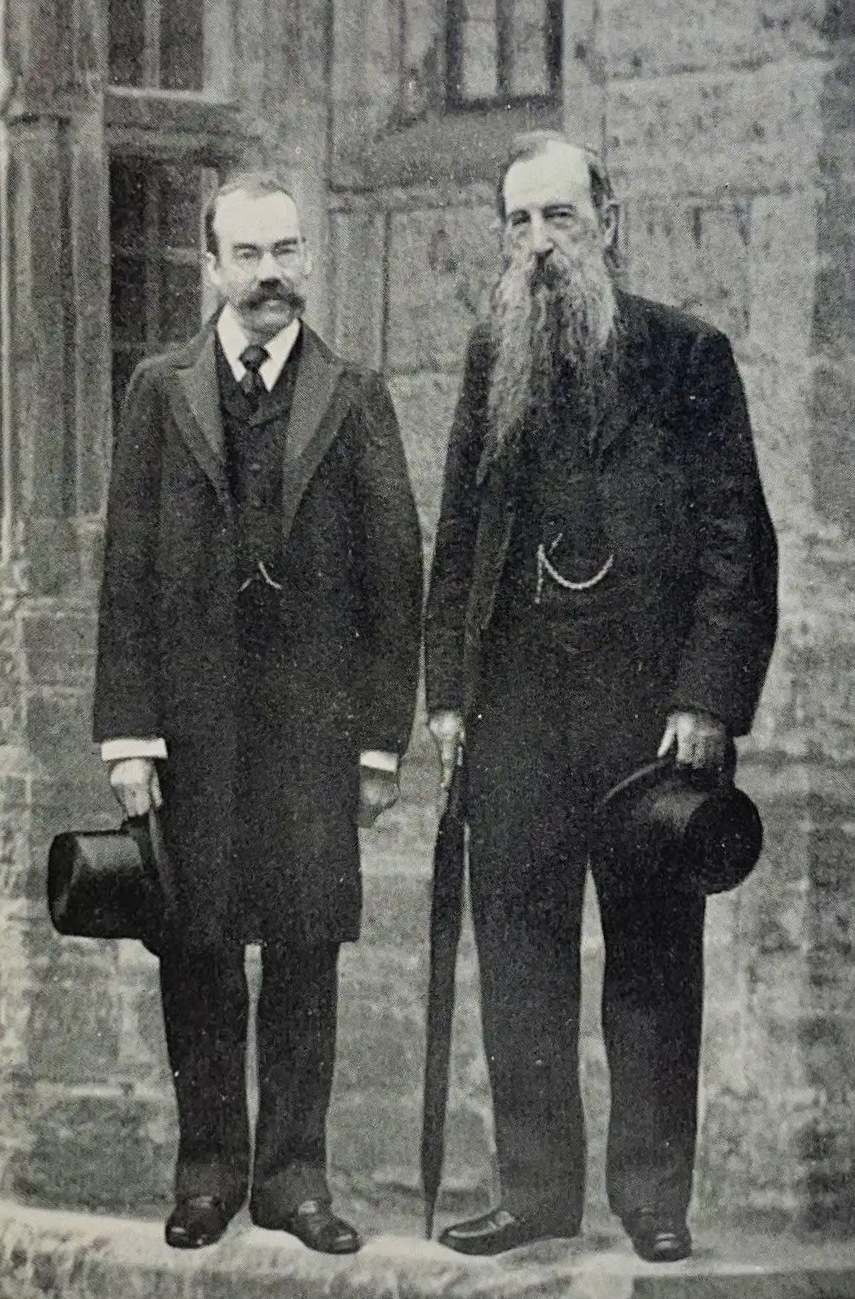
- Mill and Alexander Buchan in 1901
- Born: 28 May 1861; Thurso, Scotland
- Died: 5 April 1950 (aged 88)
- Education: University of Edinburgh
- Scientific career
- Fields: geography meteorology

Hugh Robert Mill FRSE FRGS (28 May 1861 – 5 April 1950) was a British geographer, oceanographer, and meteorologist who was influential in the reform of geography teaching, and in the development of meteorology as a science. He had a special interest in the exploration of the Antarctic and served as the British representative for the International Council for the Exploration of the Sea. He was President of the Royal Meteorological Society for 1907/8, and President of the Geographical Association in 1932.

== Early life and education ==
Mill was born in Thurso, the tenth child of Dr James Mill, a physician and farmer. He was educated locally and partly at home due to poor health. He then studied chemistry and physics at the University of Edinburgh, graduating in 1883. He was influenced by the teachings of Crum Brown, P. G. Tait, James Geikie, Patrick Geddes and J. Y. Buchanan. He was particularly interested in marine chemistry and worked at the Scottish Marine Station, Granton, on the reports of the Challenger Expedition of Sir John Murray. In 1884 he was appointed chemist and physicist to the Scottish marine station, and in 1887 became a lecturer at the Heriot-Watt College for the university extension movement, being at the same time (1893-9) recorder of the geographical section of the British Association. In 1885 he was elected a Fellow of the Royal Society of Edinburgh. His proposers were Sir John Murray, Alexander Buchan, David Milne Home and Peter Guthrie Tait. He won the Society's Makdougall Brisbane Prize for the period 1890-92.

In 1890 he lived on Braid Road in south Edinburgh.

== Later career ==
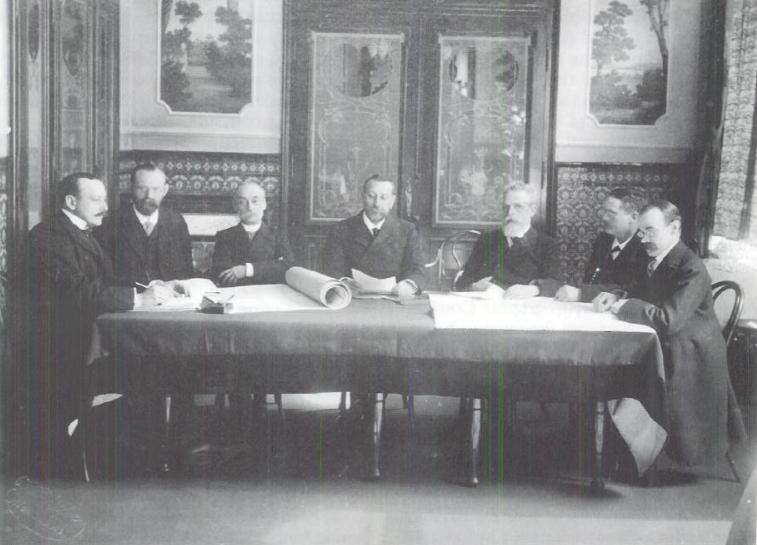
1903 meeting of ICES at Wiesbaden, Prince Albert I at centre and Mills seated second from left.

In November 1891 Mill was elected a Fellow of the Royal Geographical Society. In 1892 Mill moved to London and became librarian at the Royal Geographical Society. He became president of the geographical section in 1901. From 1902 to 1906, he was honorary secretary of the Royal Meteorological Society, and became its president in 1907. Mill served on many committees connected with meteorology and allied subjects, including the International Council for the study of the sea (1901-8), and the Board of Trade committee on the water power of the British Isles (1918). In 1901, he became director of the British Rainfall Organization, and editor of British Rainfall and Symons's Meteorological Magazine. When the British Rainfall Organization was converted into a trust in 1910, he became chairman of trustees, a position from which he retired in 1919. From 1906 to 1919 he was rainfall expert to the Metropolitan Water Board.

Mill held the post of secretary to the Royal Geographical Society during the Society's involvement with the leading British Antarctic expeditions of the late 19th and early 20th centuries. He was a friend and confidant to Scott, Shackleton, and especially to William Speirs Bruce, who led the Scottish National Antarctic Expedition, 1902–04. He initiated Bruce's move from medicine to polar research by recommending him to the Dundee Whaling Expedition to the Antarctic, 1892–93, and to other Arctic expeditions. In 1923 he produced the first full-length biography of Shackleton.

Mill received the honorary degree Doctor of laws (LL.D.) from the University of St Andrews in 1900. He received the Victoria Medal of the Royal Geographical Society (1915), the Symons Medal of the Royal Meteorological Society (1918), the Gold Medal of the Royal Scottish Geographical Society (1924) and the Cullum Geographical Medal (1929) of the American Geographical Society. In 1885, he was elected fellow of the Royal Society of Edinburgh, and in 1936, he was elected member of the Academy of Sciences Leopoldina.

== Recognition ==
Mill's first major book, The Realm of Nature, influenced the study of scientific geography. He is commemorated in the naming of the Mill Glacier, a branch of the Beardmore Glacier at 85°10′S 168°30′E.

== Family ==
He was married twice: in 1889 to Frances McDonald; and in 1937 to Alfreda Dransfield.

== Sources ==
- "Today in Science History". www.todayinsci.com.
- Speak, Peter: William Speirs Bruce, Polar Explorer and Scottish Nationalist National Museums of Scotland Publishing, Edinburgh 2003 ISBN 1-901663-71-X
