= Point Rae =

Northeast side of Scotia Bay, Antarctica

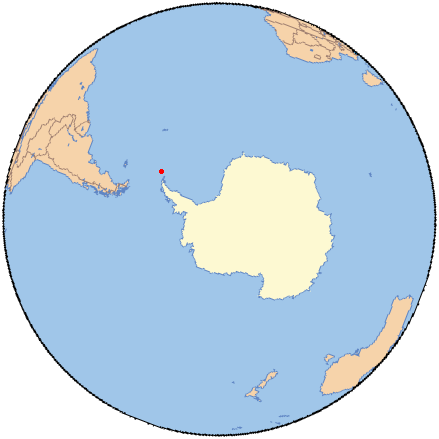
South Orkney Islands.

Point Rae (60°46′S 44°37′W) is a point marking the northeast side of the entrance to Scotia Bay on the south coast of Laurie Island, in the South Orkney Islands. It was charted in 1903 by the Scottish National Antarctic Expedition under Bruce, who named it for John Rae, Scottish Arctic explorer and member of the Sir John Richardson expedition of 1854, which discovered the fate of the Sir John Franklin Arctic expedition of 1847.
