= Saddle Island, South Orkney Islands =

Island administered under the Antarctic Treaty System

Saddle Island
- Location of Saddle Island in the South Orkney Islands

- Location within Antarctica

Geography
- Location: Antarctica
- Coordinates: 60°38′S 44°50′W
- Archipelago: South Orkney Islands
- Length: 2 mi (3 km)

Administration
- Administered under the Antarctic Treaty System

Demographics
- Population: 0

Saddle Island (60°38′S 44°50′W) is an island nearly 2 miles (3.2 km) long, consisting of twin summits barely separated by a narrow channel strewn with boulders, lying 5.5 miles (8.9 km) north of the west end of Laurie Island in the South Orkney Islands near Antarctica. It was discovered and charted in 1823 by British sealer James Weddell, who named it for its peculiar shape.

== See also ==
- Composite Antarctic Gazetteer
- List of Antarctic and sub-Antarctic islands
- List of Antarctic islands south of 60° S
- SCAR
- Territorial claims in Antarctica
