= Scottish Oceanographical Laboratory =

The Scottish Oceanographical Laboratory was founded in Nicolson Street, Edinburgh in 1906, by William Speirs Bruce, who had travelled widely in the Antarctic and Arctic regions and had led the Scottish National Antarctic Expedition (SNAE) 1902–04. Bruce had originally studied medicine at the University of Edinburgh, but had transferred his studies to the natural sciences and, through his varied experiences, had established a reputation as a polar scientist. He had also collected a large number of botanical, biological, zoological and geological specimens, together with vast amounts of meteorological and magnetic data. The laboratory, established in Edinburgh at premises in Nicolson Street, provided a place to examine, store or display these materials, an office from which Bruce could work on the SNAE scientific reports, and a base from which further expeditions could be planned.

It was Bruce's ambition that the laboratory should develop into a Scottish National Oceanographical Institute. A meeting to discuss this possibility was held in May 1914, and the proposal gained significant support from leading Scottish scientists. An organising committee was established, but the matter was shelved on the outbreak of war in August 1914 and was not revived. In 1919 lack of funding, combined with his failing health, forced Bruce to close the laboratory, donating the various specimens, books and other materials to the University of Edinburgh, the Royal Scottish Geographical Society and the Royal Scottish Museum. His illness ended with his death in 1921.

== Sources ==
- Speak, Peter: William Speirs Bruce, Polar Explorer and Scottish Nationalist National Museums of Scotland, Edinburgh 2003 ISBN 1-901663-71-X
