= Scotia (barque) =

Steamship and research vessel

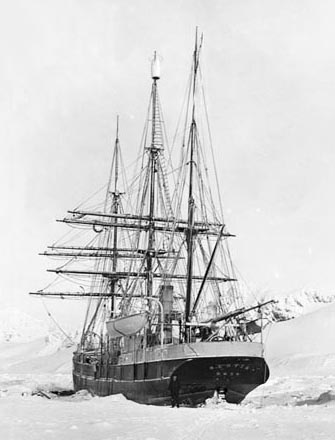
- Scotia at Laurie Island, 1903

History
- Name: Hekla (1872–1902); Scotia (1902–16)
- Owner: S S Svendsen (1872–96); N Bugge (1896–98); A/S Sæl- og Hvalfangerskib Hekla (1898–1900); A/S Hecla (1900–02); W S Bruce (1902–05)
- Operator: S S Svendsen (1872–96); N Bugge (1896–98); M C Tvethe (1898–1900); A Marcussen (1900–02); W S Bruce (1902–05); Board of Trade (1912–14)
- Port of registry: Sandefjord, Norway (1872–96); (Norway) Tønsberg (1896–98); (Norway) Christiania (1898–99); (Norway) Christiania (1899–1900); (Norway) Sandefjord (1900–02); (United Kingdom of Great Britain and Ireland) United Kingdom (1902–16)
- Builder: Jørgensen & Knudsen
- Launched: 1872
- Out of service: 18 January 1916
- Fate: Caught fire and sank

General characteristics
- Class & type: Sealer and whaler (1872–1902); Research vessel (1902–04); Sealer and whaler (1904–12); Weather ship (1912–14); Collier (1914–16)
- Tonnage: 375 GRT
- Length: 139 feet 6 inches (42.5 m)
- Beam: 28 feet 9 inches (8.8 m)
- Depth: 15 feet 6 inches (4.7 m)
- Installed power: Steam engine (1902–16)
- Propulsion: Sails, later sails and screw propeller
- Sail plan: Barque
- Speed: 7 knots (13 km/h)

Scotia was a barque that was built in 1872 as the Norwegian whaler Hekla. She was purchased in 1902 by William Speirs Bruce and refitted as a research vessel for use by the Scottish National Antarctic Expedition. After the expedition, she served as a sealer, patrol vessel and collier. She was destroyed by fire in January 1916.

== Description ==
The ship was 139 feet 6 inches (42.5 m), with a beam of 28 feet 9 inches (8.8 m). She had a depth of 15 feet 6 inches (4.7 m). The ship was assessed at 375 GRT.

== History ==
Hekla was built as a barque in 1872 by Jørgensen & Knudsen, Drammen for S. S. Svendsen of Sandefjord. She was used as a sealer, making voyages to the east coast of Greenland from 1872 to 1882 and to Scoresby Sound in 1892. In 1896, she was sold to N. Bugge, Tønsberg. She was sold in 1898 to A/S Sæl- og Hvalfangerskib Hekla, Christiania and was placed under the management of M. C. Tvethe. Hekla was sold in 1900 to A/S Hecla, Sandefjord, operated under the management of Anders Marcussen.

In 1902, she was purchased by William Speirs Bruce for kr 45,000 (£2,650). She was renamed Scotia and was rebuilt by the Ailsa Shipbuilding Company for use as a research vessel by the Scottish National Antarctic Expedition. The ship was strengthened internally, with beams 25 inches (640 mm) thick added to resist the pressure of ice whilst in the Antarctic. A new steam engine was fitted, which drove a single screw propeller. It could propel the vessel at 7 knots (13 km/h). The work was supervised by Fridtjof Nansen. When the conversion of the ship was complete, she was inspected by Colin Archer, who had prepared Fram for Nansen's 1893 expedition to the Arctic. Thomas Robertson was appointed captain of Scotia. He had twenty years' experience of sailing in the Arctic and Antarctic on board the whalers Active and Balaena. Sea trials of the rebuilt ship were conducted in August 1902.

Scotia sailed on 2 November 1902 for the Antarctic. She arrived at the Falkland Islands on 6 January 1903, She then sailed to Laurie Island, South Orkney Islands where she arrived on 25 March. Scotia overwintered in Scotia Bay, where she was frozen in for eight months. She departed for the Falkland Islands on 27 November, en route for Buenos Aires, Argentina where she underwent a refit. Scotia returned to Laurie Island on 14 February 1904, sailing eight days later for the Weddell Sea. She departed from the Antarctic on 21 March. Calling at Saint Helena in June, she arrived at Millport, Cumbrae, Ayrshire on 21 July, and was escorted by a number of ships to her final destination of Gourock, Renfrewshire.

Following the expedition, it was planned that Scotia would see further use by the universities of Scotland as a research vessel. However, she was sold by auction in an effort to recoup some of the costs of the expedition. She served as a sealer and whaler until 1913, operating off the coast of Greenland. Following the loss of Titanic, she was then chartered by the Board of Trade for use as a weather ship on the Grand Banks of Newfoundland, warning shipping of icebergs. A Marconi wireless was installed to enable her to communicate with stations on the coast of Labrador and Newfoundland. Following this, she became a collier, sailing between the United Kingdom and France. On 18 January 1916, she caught fire and was burnt out in the Bristol Channel off Sully Island, Glamorgan. Her crew survived.

== Legacy ==
Scotia was depicted on a 5/- stamp issued by the Falkland Islands. She was also depicted on two stamps issued by the British Antarctic Territory.

The Hekla Sound in northeast Greenland was named by the ill-fated 1906–1908 Denmark expedition after this ship, referring to its original name.

The Scotia Sea at the edge of the Antarctic, south of Chile and Argentina, is named after this ship. Several other features in the region are named for the ship including several ridges, undersea basins, and in particular the tectonic Scotia Plate.
