= Robert Rudmose-Brown =

Scottish botanist and explorer

- Born: 13 September 1879
- Died: 27 January 1957 (aged 77); Sheffield
- Education: Dulwich College
- Occupations: Professor (botany), University College, Dundee Consultant, Scottish Spitsbergen Syndicate; Vice-president, International Polar Congress; Lecturer (geography), Sheffield University President, Institute of British Geographers
- Known for: Botany, polar exploration

Robert Neal Rudmose-Brown (13 September 1879 – 27 January 1957) was a Scottish academic botanist and polar explorer.

== Early life ==
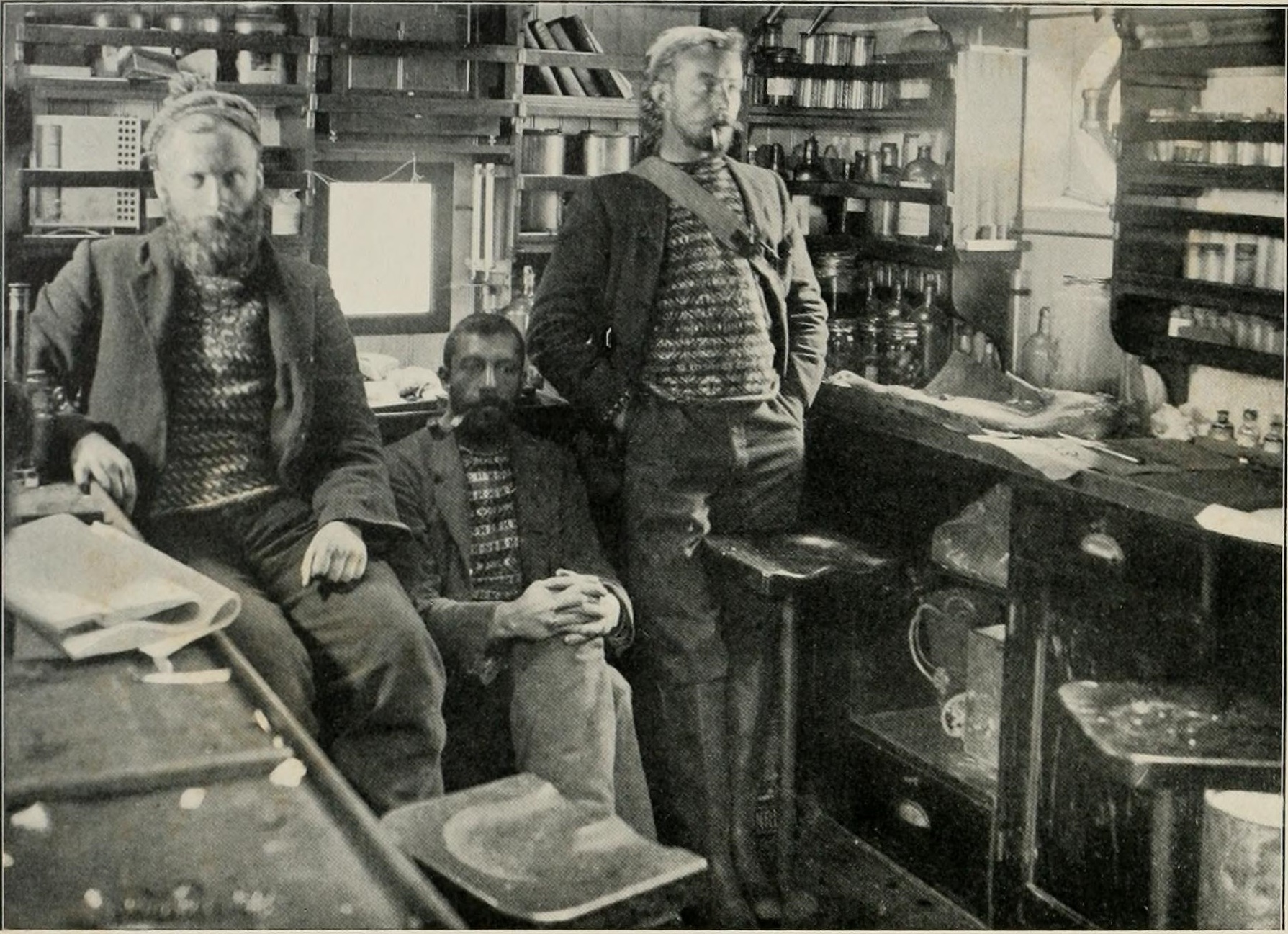
Rudmose-Brown (left) with fellow naturalists aboard the Scotia during the Scottish National Antarctic Expedition

Rudmose-Brown was born on 13 September 1879, the younger son of an Arctic enthusiast, and educated at Dulwich College. He studied Natural Sciences at the University of Aberdeen. In his first academic post, between 1900 and 1902, he assisted Professor Patrick Geddes with the teaching of botany at University College, Dundee, at that time part of the University of St Andrews.

== Antarctic exploration ==
At Dundee he met William Speirs Bruce who invited him to join the Scottish National Antarctic Expedition where he catalogued the wildlife of the South Orkney Islands. The Rudmose Rocks, charted by the expedition in 1903, were named for Rudmose-Brown by Bruce. On returning home he became Bruce’s assistant at the Scottish Oceanographical Laboratory, a consultant to the Scottish Spitsbergen Syndicate and vice-president of the International Polar Congress. In 1907 he was appointed a lecturer in geography at Sheffield University and spent several seasons as a field botanist in Svalbard.

== War Service ==
As a result of this when war came he worked at the Intelligence Department of the Naval Staff in London with responsibility for Arctic information, a role he reprised between 1939 and 1945.

== Academic rise ==
In 1920 he became reader in geography at the Manchester University and in 1931 he returned to Sheffield as professor of geography.

== Reputation consolidated ==
He was president of the Institute of British Geographers between 1937 and 1938 and at different times served as the president of the Arctic and Antarctic clubs. He died in Sheffield on 27 January 1957, bequeathing his polar library to the Scott Polar Research Institute in Cambridge.

== Bibliography ==
- Rudmose-Brown, R. N., The Voyage of the Scotia, Being the Record of a Voyage of Exploration in Antarctic Seas, 1906
- Rudmose-Brown, R. N., Principles of Economic Geography, 1920 (new ed. 1926, 1931, 1939, 1946)
- Rudmose-Brown, R. N., A Naturalist at the Poles: The Life, Work and Voyages of Dr. W.S. Bruce, the Polar Explorer, Seeley, Service & Co., London, 1923
- Rudmose-Brown, R. N., The Polar Regions: A Physical and Economic Geography of the Arctic and Antarctic, Methuen, 1927
- Rudmose-Brown, R. N. (1922). "Åland Islands". In Chisholm, Hugh (ed.). Encyclopædia Britannica (12th ed.). London & New York: The Encyclopædia Britannica Company.
- Rudmose-Brown, R. N. (1955). "Spitsbergen". Encyclopædia Britannica. Vol. 21. pp. 248–249.
