= Route Point =

Route Point (60°44′S 44°49′W) is a rocky point marking the northwest extremity of Laurie Island, in the South Orkney Islands. Discovered and named by Captain George Powell and Captain Nathaniel Palmer during their joint cruise in December 1821.
