= William Speirs Bruce =

Scottish naturalist (1867–1921)

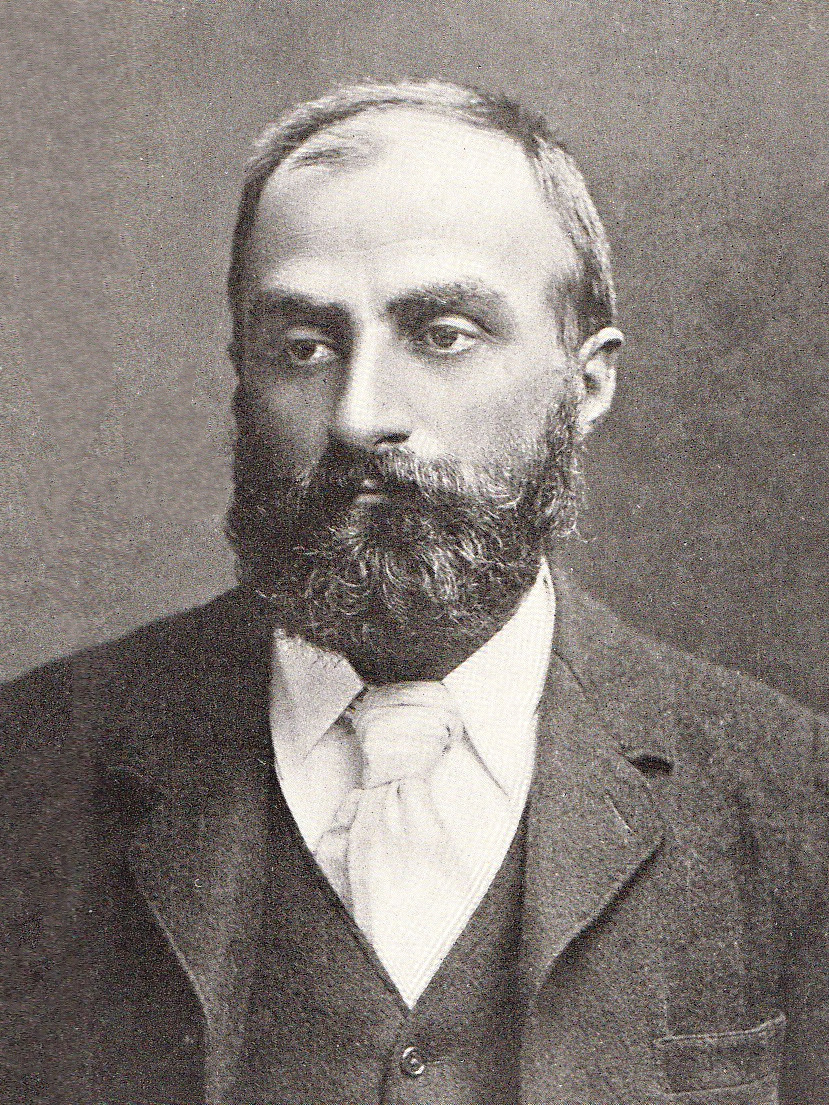
- Born: 1 August 1867; London, England
- Died: 28 October 1921 (aged 54); Edinburgh, Scotland
- Resting place: Ashes scattered in the South Atlantic Ocean off the southern shores of South Georgia
- Education: University of Edinburgh
- Occupations: Naturalist, polar scientist and explorer
- Spouse: Jessie Mackenzie (m. 1901)
- Children: 2

William Speirs Bruce FRSE (1 August 1867 – 28 October 1921) was a British naturalist, polar scientist and oceanographer who organised and led the Scottish National Antarctic Expedition (SNAE, 1902–04) to the South Orkney Islands and the Weddell Sea. Among other achievements, the expedition established the first permanent weather station in Antarctica. Bruce later founded the Scottish Oceanographical Laboratory in Edinburgh, but his plans for a transcontinental Antarctic march via the South Pole were abandoned because of lack of public and financial support.

In 1892 Bruce gave up his medical studies at the University of Edinburgh and joined the Dundee Whaling Expedition to Antarctica as a scientific assistant. This was followed by Arctic voyages to Novaya Zemlya, Spitsbergen and Franz Josef Land. In 1899 Bruce, by then Britain's most experienced polar scientist, applied for a post on Robert Falcon Scott's Discovery Expedition, but delays over this appointment and clashes with Royal Geographical Society (RGS) president Sir Clements Markham led him instead to organise his own expedition, and earned him the permanent enmity of the geographical establishment in London. Although Bruce received various awards for his polar work, including an honorary doctorate from the University of Aberdeen, neither he nor any of his SNAE colleagues were recommended by the RGS for the prestigious Polar Medal.

Between 1907 and 1920 Bruce made many journeys to the Arctic regions, both for scientific and for commercial purposes. His failure to mount any major exploration ventures after the SNAE is usually attributed to his lack of public relations skills, powerful enemies, and his Scottish nationalism. By 1919 his health was failing, and he experienced several spells in the hospital before his death in 1921, after which he was almost totally forgotten. In recent years, following the centenary of the Scottish Expedition, efforts have been made to give fuller recognition to his role in the history of scientific polar exploration.

== Early life ==
=== Home and school ===
William Speirs Bruce was born at 43 Kensington Gardens Square in London, the fourth child of Samuel Noble Bruce, a Scottish physician, and his Welsh wife Mary, née Lloyd. His middle name came from another branch of the family; its unusual spelling, as distinct from the more common "Spiers", tended to cause problems for reporters, reviewers and biographers. William passed his early childhood in the family's London home at 18 Royal Crescent, Holland Park, under the tutelage of his grandfather, the Revd William Bruce. There were regular visits to nearby Kensington Gardens, and sometimes to the Natural History Museum; according to Samuel Bruce these outings first ignited young William's interest in life and nature.

In 1879, at the age of 12, William was sent to a progressive boarding school, Norfolk County School (later Watts Naval School) in the village of North Elmham, Norfolk. He remained there until 1885, and then spent two further years at University College School, Hampstead, preparing for the matriculation examination that would admit him to the medical school at University College London (UCL). He succeeded at his third attempt, and was ready to start his medical studies in the autumn of 1887.

=== Edinburgh ===
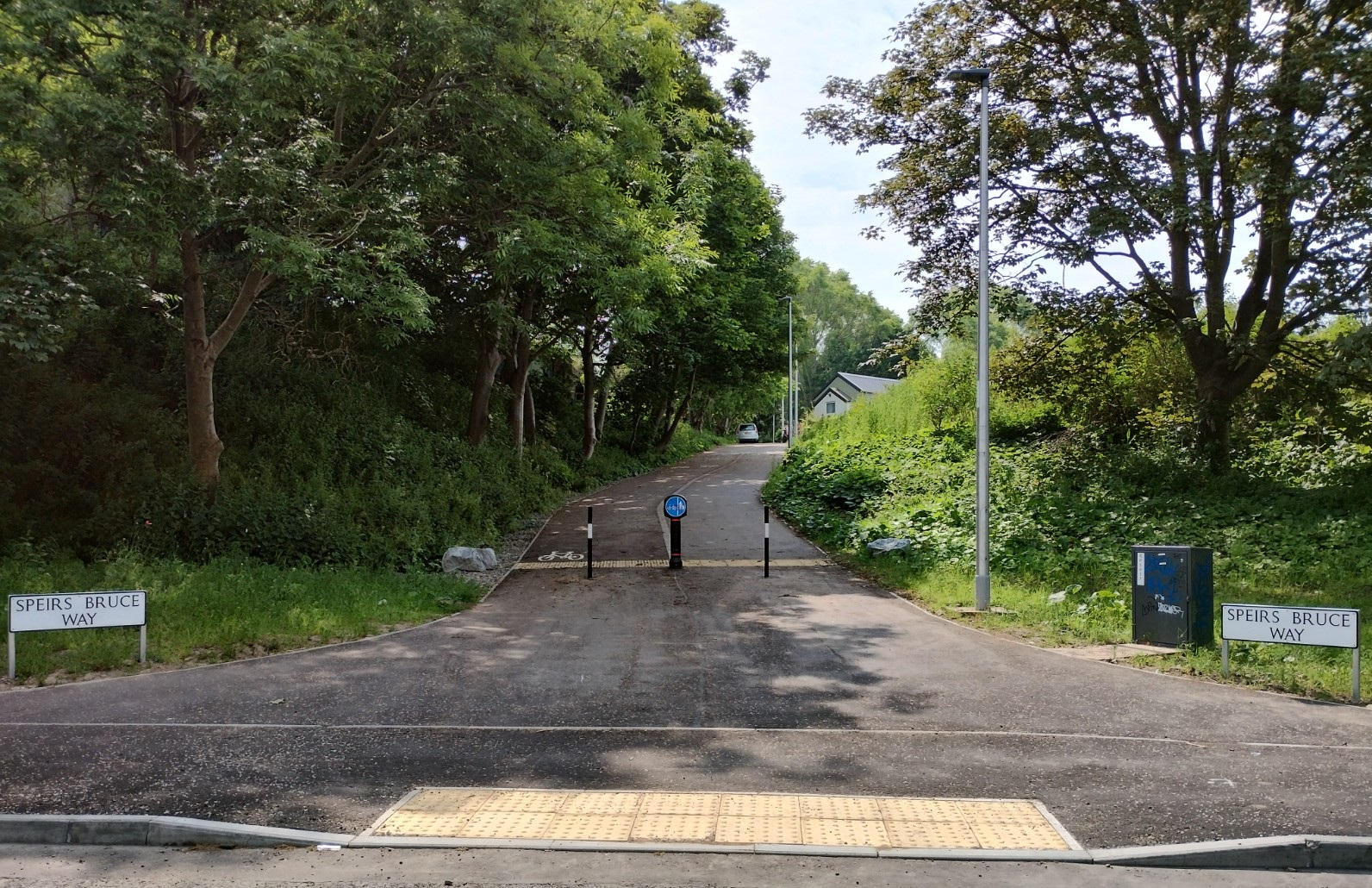
The Speirs Bruce Way in Granton, Edinburgh, Scotland, named for William Speirs Bruce

During mid-1887, Bruce travelled north to Edinburgh to attend a pair of vacation courses in natural sciences. The six-week courses, at the recently established Scottish Marine Station at Granton on the Firth of Forth, were under the direction of Patrick Geddes and John Arthur Thomson, and included sections on botany and practical zoology. The experience of Granton, and the contact with some of the foremost contemporary natural scientists, convinced Bruce to stay in Scotland. He abandoned his place at UCL, and enrolled instead in the medical school at the University of Edinburgh. This enabled him to maintain contact with mentors such as Geddes and Thomson, and also gave him the opportunity to work during his free time in the Edinburgh laboratories where specimens brought back from the Challenger expedition were being examined and classified. Here he worked under Dr John Murray and his assistant John Young Buchanan, and gained a deeper understanding of oceanography and invaluable experience in the principles of scientific investigation.

== First voyages ==
=== Dundee Whaling Expedition ===
A drawing illustrating the size of a typical right whale, in relation to the size of a person

The Dundee Whaling Expedition, 1892–1893, was an attempt to investigate the commercial possibilities of whaling in Antarctic waters by locating a source of right whales in the region. Scientific observations and oceanographic research would also be carried out in the four whaling ships: Balaena, Active, Diana and Polar Star. Bruce was recommended to the expedition by Hugh Robert Mill, an acquaintance from Granton who was now librarian to the Royal Geographical Society in London. Although it would finally curtail his medical studies, (Note: In fact, Bruce never resumed his medical studies and did not qualify as a physician. His later title of "Doctor" came from an honorary D. Litt.) Bruce did not hesitate; with William Gordon Burn Murdoch as an assistant he took up his duties on Balaena under Capt. Alexander Fairweather. The four ships sailed from Dundee on 6 September 1892.

The relatively short expedition—Bruce was back in Scotland in May 1893—failed in its main purpose, and gave only limited opportunities for scientific work. No right whales were found, and to cut the expedition's losses a mass slaughter of seals was ordered, to secure skins, oil and blubber. Bruce found this distasteful, especially as he was expected to share in the killing. The scientific output from the voyage was, in Bruce's words "a miserable show". In a letter to the Royal Geographical Society he wrote: "The general bearing of the master (Captain Fairweather) was far from being favourable to scientific work". Bruce was denied access to charts, so was unable to establish the accurate location of phenomena. He was required to work "in the boats" when he should have been making meteorological and other observations, and no facilities were allowed him for the preparation of specimens, many of which were lost through careless handling by the crew. Nevertheless, his letter to the RGS ends: "I have to thank the Society for assisting me in what has been, despite all drawbacks, an instructive and delightful experience." In a further letter to Mill he outlined his wishes to go South again, adding: "the taste I have had has made me ravenous".

Within months he was making proposals for a scientific expedition to South Georgia, but the RGS would not support his plans. In early 1896 he considered collaboration with the Norwegians Henryk Bull and Carsten Borchgrevink in an attempt to reach the South Magnetic Pole. This, too, failed to materialise.

=== Jackson–Harmsworth Expedition ===
From September 1895 to June 1896 Bruce worked at the Ben Nevis summit meteorological station, where he gained further experience in scientific procedures and with meteorological instruments. In June 1896, again on the recommendation of Mill, he left this post to join the Jackson–Harmsworth Expedition, then in its third year in the Arctic on Franz Josef Land. This expedition, led by Frederick George Jackson and financed by newspaper magnate Alfred Harmsworth, had left London in 1894. It was engaged in a detailed survey of the Franz Josef archipelago, which had been discovered, though not properly mapped, during an Austrian expedition 20 years earlier. Jackson's party was based at Cape Flora on Northbrook Island, the southernmost island of the archipelago. It was supplied through regular visits from its expedition ship Windward, on which Bruce sailed from London on 9 June 1896.

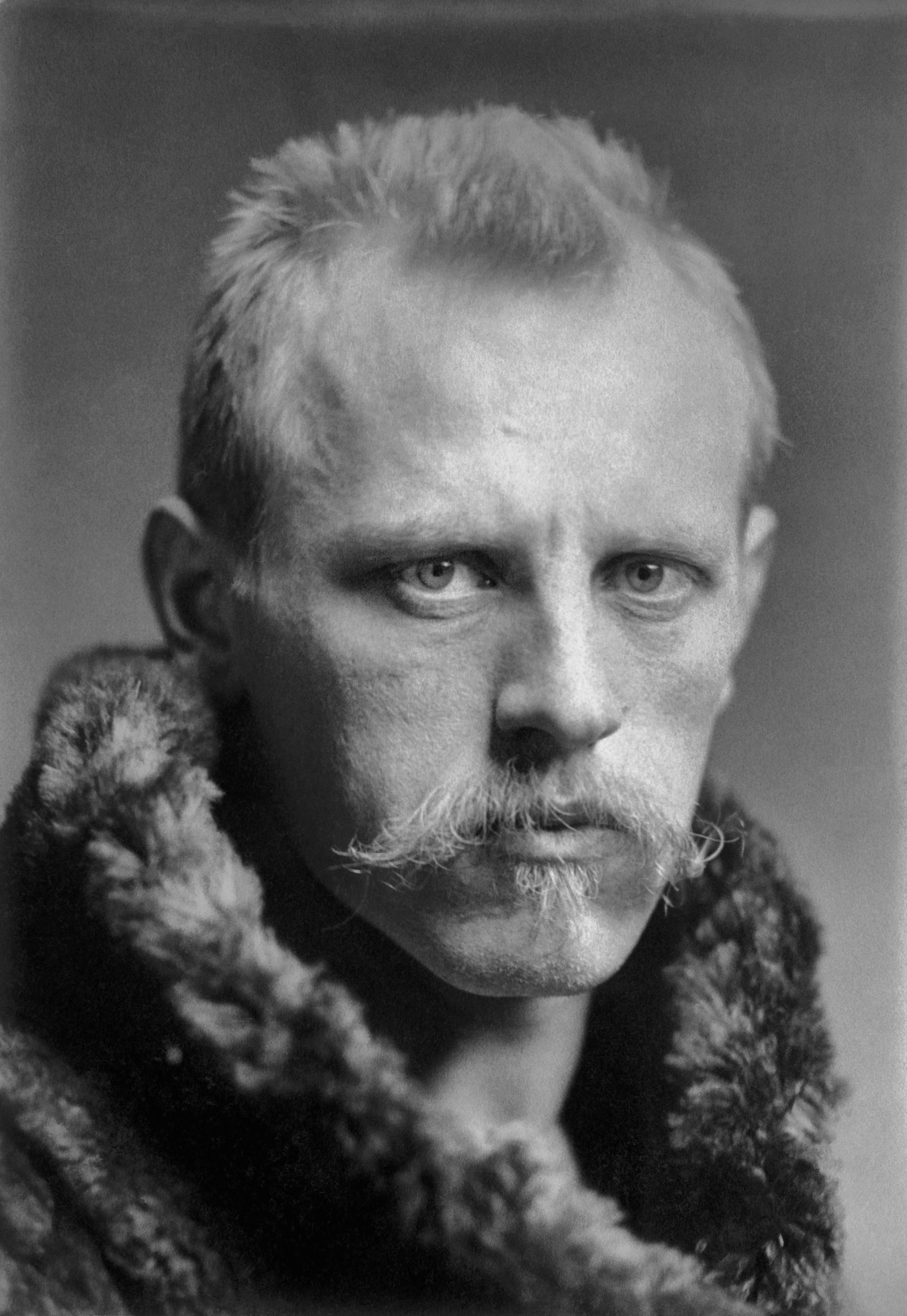
Fridtjof Nansen

Windward arrived at Cape Flora on 25 July where Bruce found that Jackson's expedition party had been joined by Fridtjof Nansen and his companion Hjalmar Johansen. The two Norwegians had been living on the ice for more than a year since leaving their ship Fram for a dash to the North Pole, and it was pure chance that had brought them to the one inhabited spot among thousands of square miles of Arctic wastes. Bruce mentions meeting Nansen in a letter to Mill, and his acquaintance with the celebrated Norwegian would be a future source of much advice and encouragement.

During his year at Cape Flora Bruce collected around 700 zoological specimens, in often very disagreeable conditions. According to Jackson: "It is no pleasant job to dabble in icy-cold water, with the thermometer some degrees below zero, or to plod in the summer through snow, slush and mud many miles in search of animal life, as I have known Mr Bruce frequently to do". Jackson named Cape Bruce after him, on the northern edge of Northbrook Island, at 80°55′N. Jackson was less pleased with Bruce's proprietorial attitude to his personal specimens, which he refused to entrust to the British Museum with the expedition's other finds. This "tendency towards scientific conceit", and lack of tact in interpersonal dealings, were early demonstrations of character flaws that in later life would be held against him.

=== Arctic voyages ===
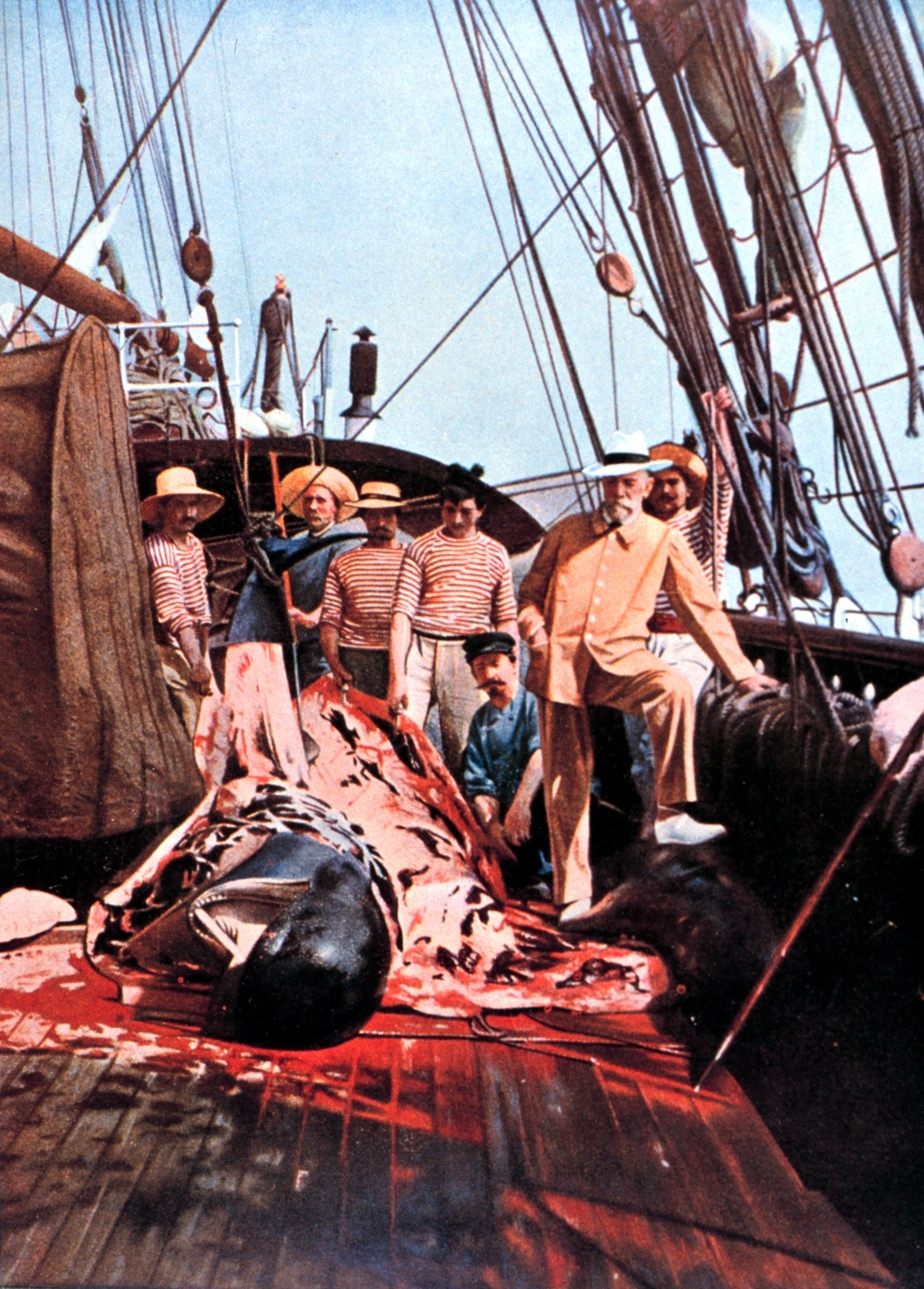
Prince Albert of Monaco, aboard Princesse Alice, with a dissected cetacean

On his return from Franz Josef Land in 1897, Bruce worked in Edinburgh as an assistant to his former mentor John Arthur Thomson, and resumed his duties at the Ben Nevis observatory. In March 1898 he received an offer to join Major Andrew Coats on a hunting voyage to the Arctic waters around Novaya Zemlya and Spitsbergen, in the private yacht Blencathra. This offer had originally been made to Mill, who was unable to obtain leave from the Royal Geographical Society, and once again suggested Bruce as a replacement. Andrew Coats was a member of the prosperous Coats family of thread manufacturers, who had founded the Coats Observatory at Paisley. (Note: Bruce's association with this family would be of great future benefit to him, through their financial backing for his main Antarctic venture a few years later.)

Bruce joined Blencathra at Tromsø, Norway in May 1898, for a cruise which explored the Barents Sea, the dual islands of Novaya Zemlya, and the island of Kolguyev, before a retreat to Vardø in northeastern Norway to reprovision for the voyage to Spitsbergen. In a letter to Mill, Bruce reported: "This is a pure yachting cruise and life is luxurious". But his scientific work was unabated: "I have been taking 4-hourly observations in meteorology and temperature of the sea surface [...] have tested salinity with Buchanan's hydrometer; my tow-nets [...] have been going almost constantly."

Blencathra sailed for Spitsbergen, but was stopped by ice, so she returned to Tromsø. Here she encountered the research ship Princesse Alice, purpose-built for Prince Albert I of Monaco, a leading oceanographer. Bruce was delighted when the Prince invited him to join Princesse Alice on a hydrographic survey around Spitsbergen. The ship sailed up the west coast of the main island of the Spitsbergen group, and visited Adventfjorden and Smeerenburg in the north. During the latter stages of the voyage Bruce was placed in charge of the voyage's scientific observations.

The following year Bruce was invited to join Prince Albert on another oceanographic cruise to Spitsbergen. At Red Bay, latitude 80°N, Bruce ascended the highest peak in the area, which the prince named "Ben Nevis" in his honour. When Princesse Alice ran aground on a submerged rock and appeared stranded, Prince Albert instructed Bruce to begin preparations for a winter camp, in the belief that it might be impossible for the ship to escape. Fortunately she floated free, and was able to return to Tromsø for repairs.

== Marriage and family life ==
It is uncertain how Bruce was employed after his return from Spitsbergen in late 1899. In his whole life he rarely had settled salaried work, and usually relied on patronage or on influential acquaintances to find him temporary posts. Early in 1901 he evidently felt sufficiently confident of his prospects to get married. His bride was Jessie Mackenzie, who had worked as a nurse in Samuel Bruce's London surgery. Bruce's marriage took place in the United Free Church of Scotland, in Chapelhill within the Parish of Nigg on 20 January 1901, being attended and witnessed by their parents. Perhaps, due to Bruce's secretive nature presenting limited details even among his circle of close friends and colleagues, little information about the wedding has been recorded by his biographers.

In 1907 the Bruces settled in a house at South Morton Street in Joppa near the coastal Edinburgh suburb of Portobello, in the first of a series of addresses in that area. They named their house "Antarctica". A son, Eillium Alastair, was born in April 1902, and a daughter, Sheila Mackenzie, was born seven years later. During these years Bruce founded the Scottish Ski Club and became its first president. He was also a co-founder of Edinburgh Zoo.

Bruce's chosen life as an explorer, his unreliable sources of income and his frequent extended absences, all placed severe strains on the marriage, and the couple became estranged around 1916. They continued to live in the same house until Bruce's death. Eillium became a Merchant Navy officer, eventually captaining a Fisheries Research Ship which, by chance, bore the name Scotia.

== Scottish National Antarctic Expedition ==
Sir Clements Markham, President of the Royal Geographical Society

=== Dispute with Markham ===
On 15 March 1899 Bruce wrote to Sir Clements Markham at the RGS, offering himself for the scientific staff of the National Antarctic Expedition, then in its early planning stages. Markham's reply was a non-committal one-line acknowledgement, after which Bruce heard nothing for a year. He was then told, indirectly, to apply for a scientific assistant's post. On 21 March 1900 Bruce reminded Markham that he had applied a year earlier, and went on to reveal that he "was not without hopes of being able to raise sufficient capital whereby I could take out a second British ship". He followed this up a few days later, and reported that the funding for a second ship was now assured, making his first explicit references to a "Scottish Expedition". This alarmed Markham, who replied with some anger: "Such a course will be most prejudicial to the Expedition [...] A second ship is not in the least required [...] I do not know why this mischievous rivalry should have been started". (Note: The tone of Markham's letter, and particularly the "mischievous rivalry" jibe, rankled with Bruce long after. He refers to the term in a 1917 letter to his MP, Charles Edward Price, when Bruce was still campaigning for the awards of Polar Medals. See Speak, pp. 129–31.)

Bruce replied by return, denying rivalry, and asserting: "If my friends are prepared to give me money to carry out my plans I do not see why I should not accept it [...] there are several who maintain that a second ship is highly desirable". Unappeased, Markham wrote back: "As I was doing my best to get you appointed (to the National Antarctic Expedition) I had a right to think you would not take such a step [...] without at least consulting me". He continued: "You will cripple the National Expedition [...] in order to get up a scheme for yourself".

Bruce replied formally, saying that the funds he had raised in Scotland would not have been forthcoming for any other project. There was no further correspondence between the two, beyond a short conciliatory note from Markham, in February 1901, which read "I can now see things from your point of view, and wish you success"—a sentiment apparently not reflected in Markham's subsequent attitude towards the Scottish expedition.

=== Voyage of the Scotia ===
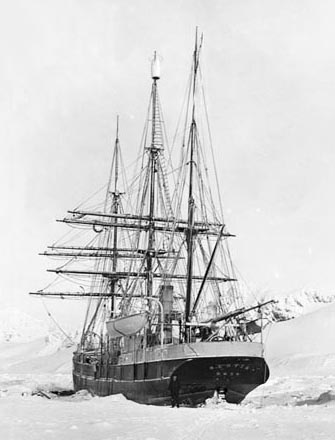
Scotia, anchored at Laurie Island. 1903

With financial support from the Coats family, Bruce had acquired a Norwegian whaler, Hekla, which he transformed into a fully equipped Antarctic research ship, renamed Scotia. He then appointed an all-Scottish crew and scientific team. (Note: For full listing of ship's and shore parties, see Speak, pp. 67–68.) Scotia left Troon on 2 November 1902, and headed south towards Antarctica, where Bruce intended to set up winter quarters in the Weddell Sea quadrant, "as near to the South Pole as is practicable". (Note: The largely unexplored Antarctica continent had been divided by the RGS for convenience into four distinct geographic quadrants: Ross, Victoria, Enderby and Weddell Sea.) On 22 February the ship reached 70°25′S, but could proceed no further because of heavy ice. She retreated to Laurie Island in the South Orkneys chain, and wintered there in a bay he named Scotia Bay. A meteorological station, Omond House (named after Robert Traill Omond), was established as part of a full programme of scientific work.

In November 1903 Scotia retreated to Buenos Aires for repair and reprovisioning. While in Argentina, Bruce negotiated an agreement with the government whereby Omond House became a permanent weather station, under Argentinian control. Renamed Orcadas Base, the site has been continuously in operation since then, and provides the longest historical meteorological series of Antarctica. In January 1904 Scotia sailed south again, to explore the Weddell Sea. On 6 March, new land was sighted, part of the sea's eastern boundary; Bruce named this Coats Land after the expedition's chief backers. On 14 March, at 74°01′S and in danger of becoming icebound, Scotia turned north. The long voyage back to Scotland, via Cape Town, was completed on 21 July 1904.

This expedition assembled a large collection of animal, marine and plant specimens, and carried out extensive hydrographic, magnetic and meteorological observations. One hundred years later it was recognised that the expedition's work had "laid the foundation of modern climate change studies", and that its experimental work had shown this part of the globe to be crucially important to the world's climate. According to the oceanographer Tony Rice, it fulfilled a more comprehensive programme than any other Antarctic expedition of its day. At the time its reception in Britain was relatively muted; although its work was highly praised within sections of the scientific community, Bruce struggled to raise the funding to publish his scientific results, and blamed Markham for the lack of national recognition.

== Post-expedition years ==
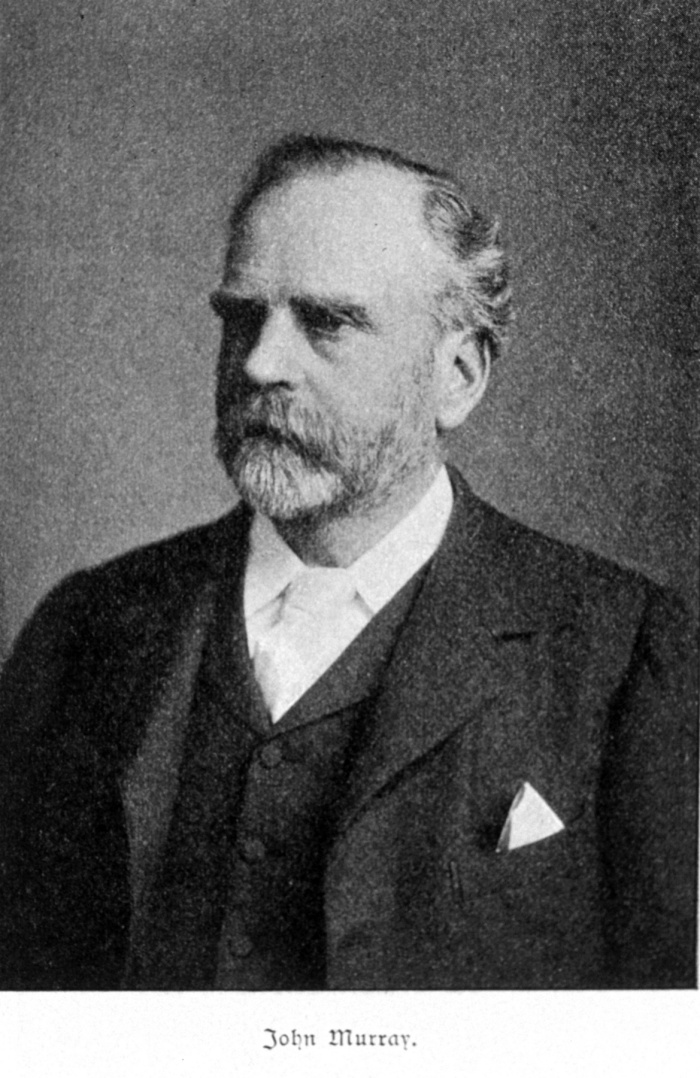
Sir John Murray, an early mentor to Bruce

=== Scottish Oceanographical Laboratory ===
Bruce's collection of specimens, gathered from more than a decade of Arctic and Antarctic travel, required a permanent home. Bruce himself needed a base from which the detailed scientific reports of the Scotia voyage could be prepared for publication. He obtained premises in Nicolson Street, Edinburgh, in which he established a laboratory and museum, naming it the Scottish Oceanographical Laboratory, with the ultimate ambition that it should become the Scottish National Oceanographic Institute. It was officially opened by Prince Albert of Monaco in 1906.

Within these premises Bruce housed his meteorological and oceanographic equipment, in preparation for future expeditions. He also met there with fellow-explorers, including Nansen, Shackleton, and Roald Amundsen. His main task was masterminding the preparation of the SNAE scientific reports. These, at considerable cost and much delay, were published between 1907 and 1920, except for one volume—Bruce's own log—that remained unpublished until 1992, after its rediscovery. Bruce maintained a wide correspondence with experts, including Sir Joseph Hooker, who had travelled to the Antarctic with James Clark Ross in 1839–43, and to whom Bruce dedicated his short book Polar Exploration.

In 1914 discussions began toward finding more permanent homes, both for Bruce's collection and, following the death that year of oceanographer Sir John Murray, for the specimens and library of the Challenger expedition. Bruce proposed that a new centre should be created as a memorial to Murray. There was unanimous agreement to proceed, but the project was curtailed by the outbreak of war, and not revived. The Scottish Oceanographical Laboratory continued until 1919, when Bruce, in poor health, was forced to close it, dispersing its contents to the Royal Scottish Museum, the Royal Scottish Geographical Society (RSGS), and the University of Edinburgh.

=== Further Antarctic plans ===
On 17 March 1910 Bruce presented proposals to the Royal Scottish Geographical Society (RSGS) for a new Scottish Antarctic expedition. His plan envisaged a party wintering in or near Coats Land, while the ship took another group to the Ross Sea, on the opposite side of the continent. During the second season the Coats Land party would cross the continent on foot, via the South Pole, while the Ross Sea party pushed south to meet them and assist them home. The expedition would also carry out extensive oceanographical and other scientific work. Bruce estimated that the total cost would be about £50,000 (2025 value about £5,090,000).

The RSGS supported these proposals, as did the Royal Society of Edinburgh, the University of Edinburgh, and other Scottish organisations, but the timing was wrong; the Royal Geographical Society in London was fully occupied with Robert Scott's Terra Nova Expedition, and showed no interest in Bruce's plans. No rich private benefactors came forward, and persistent and intensive lobbying of the government for financial backing failed. Bruce suspected that his efforts were, as usual, being undermined by the aged but still influential Markham. Finally accepting that his venture would not take place, he gave generous support and advice to Ernest Shackleton, who in 1913 announced plans, similar to Bruce's, for his Imperial Trans-Antarctic Expedition. Shackleton not only received £10,000 from the government, but raised large sums from private sources, including £24,000 from Scottish industrialist Sir James Caird of Dundee. (Note: This contribution was worth at least £1.5 million in 2008 terms (Measuring Worth). Caird, who had no known connection with Bruce, was rewarded for his generosity to Shackleton by the naming of Caird Coast (part of Coats Land previously named by Bruce), and by the naming of the whaler James Caird, in which Shackleton made his open-boat rescue journey to South Georgia.)

Shackleton's expedition was an epic adventure, but failed completely in its main endeavour of a transcontinental crossing. Bruce was not consulted by the Shackleton relief committee about that expedition's rescue, when the need arose in 1916. "Myself, I suppose," he wrote, "because of being north of the Tweed, they think dead".

=== Scottish Spitsbergen syndicate ===
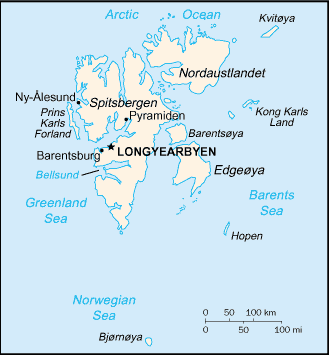
Map of Spitsbergen archipelago (now named Svalbard), showing the islands Prince Charles Foreland, Barentsøya and Edgeøya

During his Spitsbergen visits with Prince Albert in 1898 and 1899, Bruce had detected the presence of coal, gypsum and possibly oil. In the summers of 1906 and 1907 he again accompanied the Prince to the archipelago, with the primary purpose of surveying and mapping Prince Charles Foreland, an island unvisited during the earlier voyages. Here Bruce found further deposits of coal, and indications of iron. On the basis of these finds, Bruce set up a mineral prospecting company, the Scottish Spitsbergen Syndicate, in July 1909.

At that time, in international law Spitsbergen was regarded as terra nullius—rights to mine and extract could be established simply by registering a claim. Bruce's syndicate registered claims on Prince Charles Foreland and on the islands of Barentsøya and Edgeøya, among other areas. A sum of £4,000 (out of a target of £6,000) was subscribed to finance the costs of a detailed prospecting expedition in 1909, in a chartered vessel with a full scientific team. The results were "disappointing", and the voyage absorbed almost all of the syndicate's funds.

Bruce paid two further visits to Spitsbergen, in 1912 and 1914, but the outbreak of war prevented further immediate developments. Early in 1919 the old syndicate was replaced by a larger and better-financed company. Bruce had now fixed his main hopes on the discovery of oil, but scientific expeditions in 1919 and 1920 failed to provide evidence of its presence; substantial new deposits of coal and iron ore were discovered. Thereafter Bruce was too ill to continue with his involvement. The new company had expended most of its capital on these prospecting ventures, and although it continued to exist, under various ownerships, until 1952, there is no record of profitable extraction. Its assets and claims were finally acquired by a rival concern.

== Later life ==
=== Polar Medals withheld ===
During his lifetime Bruce received many awards: the Gold Medal of the Royal Scottish Geographical Society in 1904; the Patron's Medal of the Royal Geographical Society in 1910; the Neill prize and Medal of the Royal Society of Edinburgh in 1913, and the Livingstone Medal of the American Geographical Society in 1920. He also received an honorary LLD degree from the University of Aberdeen. (Note: On the basis of this honorary degree Bruce was usually described thereafter as "Dr Bruce", although this style is not generally used in Britain for doctorates honoris causa.) The honour that eluded him was the Polar Medal, awarded by the Sovereign on the recommendation of the Royal Geographical Society. The Medal was awarded to the members of every other British or Commonwealth Antarctic expedition during the early 20th century, but the SNAE was the exception; the medal was withheld.

Bruce, and those close to him, blamed Markham for this omission. The matter was raised, repeatedly, with anyone thought to have influence. Robert Rudmose Brown, chronicler of the Scotia voyage and later Bruce's first biographer, wrote in a 1913 letter to the President of the Royal Scottish Geographical Society that this neglect was "a slight to Scotland and to Scottish endeavour". Bruce wrote in March 1915 to the President of the Royal Society of Edinburgh, who agreed in his reply that "Markham had much to answer for". After Markham's death in 1916 Bruce sent a long letter to his Member of Parliament, Charles Price, detailing Sir Clements's malice towards him and the Scottish expedition, ending with a heartfelt cry on behalf of his old comrades: "Robertson (Note: Thomas Robertson, captain of Scotia.) is dying without his well won white ribbon! The Mate is dead!! The Chief Engineer is dead!!! Everyone as good men as have ever served on any Polar Expedition, yet they did not receive the white ribbon."

No award was made and nearly a century later, the matter was raised in the Scottish Parliament. On 4 November 2002 MSP Michael Russell tabled a motion relating to the SNAE centenary, which concluded: "The Polar Medal Advisory Committee should recommend the posthumous award of the Polar Medal to Dr William Speirs Bruce, in recognition of his status as one of the key figures in early 20th century polar scientific exploration".

=== Last years ===
After the outbreak of war in 1914, Bruce's prospecting ventures were on hold. He offered his services to the Admiralty, but failed to obtain an appointment. In 1915 he accepted a post as director and manager of a whaling company based in the Seychelles, and spent four months there, but the venture failed. On his return to Britain he finally secured a minor post at the Admiralty.

Bruce continued to lobby for recognition, highlighting the distinctions between the treatment of SNAE and that of English expeditions. When the war finished he attempted to revive his various interests, but his health was failing, forcing him to close his laboratory. On the 1920 voyage to Spitsbergen he travelled in an advisory role, unable to participate in the detailed work. On return, he was confined in the Edinburgh Royal Infirmary and later in the Liberton Hospital, Edinburgh, where he died on 28 October 1921. In accordance with his wishes he was cremated, and the ashes taken to South Georgia to be scattered on the southern sea. Despite his irregular income and general lack of funds, his estate realised £7,000 (2025 value about £300,000).

== Assessment ==
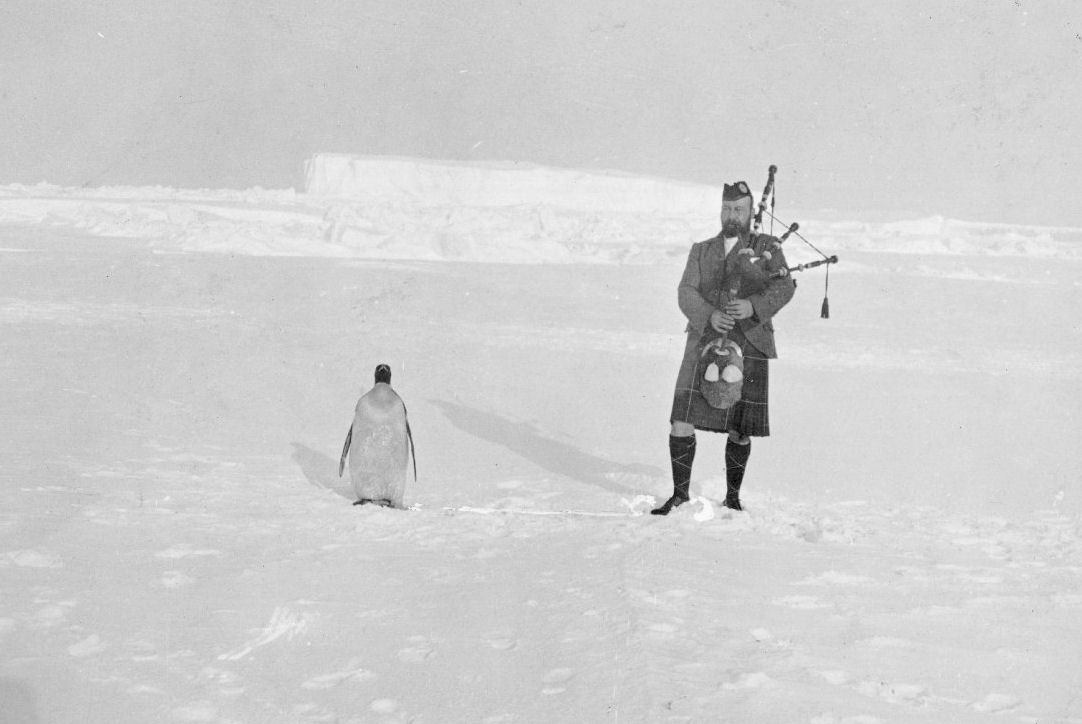
An enduring image of the Scottish National Antarctic Expedition: Piper Gilbert Kerr, with penguin, photographed by Bruce

After Bruce's death his long-time friend and colleague Robert Rudmose Brown wrote, in a letter to Bruce's father: "His name is imperishably enrolled among the world's great explorers, and the martyrs to unselfish scientific devotion." Rudmose Brown's biography was published in 1923, and in the same year a joint committee of Edinburgh's learned societies instituted the Bruce Memorial Prize, an award for young polar scientists. Thereafter his name continued to be respected in scientific circles, but Bruce and his achievements were forgotten by the general public. Occasional mentions of him, in polar histories and biographies of major figures such as Scott and Shackleton, tended to be dismissive and inaccurate. (Note: An example of Bruce's treatment by English writers is in Huxley, Scott of the Antarctic, p. 52. She writes: "There was Bruce's venture shortly to sail in the Scotia to the Weddell Sea; this, too, got trapped in sea-ice and returned without ever reaching the land".)

The early years of the 21st century have seen a reassessment of Bruce's work. Contributory factors have been the SNAE centenary, and Scotland's renewed sense of national identity. A 2003 expedition, in a modern research ship "Scotia", used information collected by Bruce as a basis for examining climate change in South Georgia. This expedition predicted "dramatic conclusions" relating to global warming from its research, and saw this contribution as a "fitting tribute to Britain's forgotten polar hero, William Speirs Bruce".

An hour-long BBC television documentary on Bruce presented by Neil Oliver in 2011 contrasted his meticulous science with his rivals' aim of enhancing imperial prestige. A new biographer, Peter Speak (2003), claims that the SNAE was "by far the most cost-effective and carefully planned scientific expedition of the Heroic Age".

The same author considers reasons why Bruce's efforts to capitalise on this success met with failure, and suggests a combination of his shy, solitary, uncharismatic nature and his "fervent" Scottish nationalism. Bruce seemingly lacked public relations skills and the ability to promote his work, after the fashion of Scott and Shackleton; a lifelong friend described him as being "as prickly as the Scottish thistle itself". On occasion he behaved tactlessly, as with Jackson over the question of the specimens brought back from Franz Josef Land, and on another occasion with the Royal Geographical Society, over the question of a minor expense claim.

As to his nationalism, he wished to see Scotland on an equal footing with other nations. His national pride was intense; in a Preparatory Note to The Voyage of the Scotia he wrote: "While 'Science' was the talisman of the Expedition, 'Scotland' was emblazoned on its flag". This insistence on emphasising the Scottish character of his enterprises could be irksome to those who did not share his passion. He retained the respect and devotion of those whom he led, and of those who had known him longest. John Arthur Thomson, who had known Bruce since Granton, wrote of him when reviewing Rudmose Brown's 1923 biography: "We never heard him once grumble about himself, though he was neither to hold or bend when he thought some injustice was being done to, or slight cast on, his men, on his colleagues, on his laboratory, on his Scotland. Then one got glimpses of the volcano which his gentle spirit usually kept sleeping."

== See also ==
- List of recipients of the W. S. Bruce Medal

== Sources ==
- Bruce, William S. (1911). Polar Exploration. Home university library of modern knowledge. London: Williams and Norgate. ISBN 0-665-80788-0. OCLC 53687410.
- Fleming, Fergus (2001). Ninety Degrees North. London: Granta Books. ISBN 1-86207-449-6.
- Goodlad, James A. (2003). Scotland and the Antarctic, Section 5: Voyage of the Scotia. Royal Scottish Geographical Society. ISBN 0-904049-04-3 – via Glasgow Digital Library.
- Goodlad, James A. (2003). Scotland and the Antarctic, Section 6: After the Scotia expedition. Royal Scottish Geographical Society. ISBN 0-904049-04-3 – via Glasgow Digital Library.
- Goodlad, James A. (2003). Scotland and the Antarctic, Section 7: The legacy of Bruce. Royal Scottish Geographical Society. ISBN 0-904049-04-3 – via Glasgow Digital Library.
- Huntford, Roland (1985). Shackleton. London: Hodder & Stoughton. ISBN 0-340-25007-0. OCLC 13108800.
- Huxley, Elspeth (1977). Scott of the Antarctic. London: Weidenfeld & Nicolson. ISBN 0-297-77433-6.
- Rudmose Brown, R. N.; Pirie, J. H.; Mossman, R. C. (2002). The Voyage of the Scotia. Edinburgh: Mercat Press. ISBN 1-84183-044-5.
- Speak, Peter (2003). William Speirs Bruce: Polar Explorer and Scottish Nationalist. Edinburgh: NMS Publishing. ISBN 1-901663-71-X.

Online sources

- Collingridge, Vanessa (9 May 2003). "Diary of Climate Change". BBC Radio 4.
- "Measuring Worth". Institute for the Measurement of Worth.
- Swinney, G. N. (12 September 2002). "William Speirs Bruce, Scotland, polar meteorology and oceanography". Museum of the World Ocean Congress. vitiaz.ru. Archived from the original on 25 September 2006.
- "Scottish Parliament Business Bulletin No. 156/2002 Section F: S1M=3530#". Scottish Parliament. 4 November 2002. Archived from the original on 3 October 2011.
- "William Speirs Bruce 1867–1921". Gazetteer for Scotland.
