= Laurie Island =

Island in Antarctica

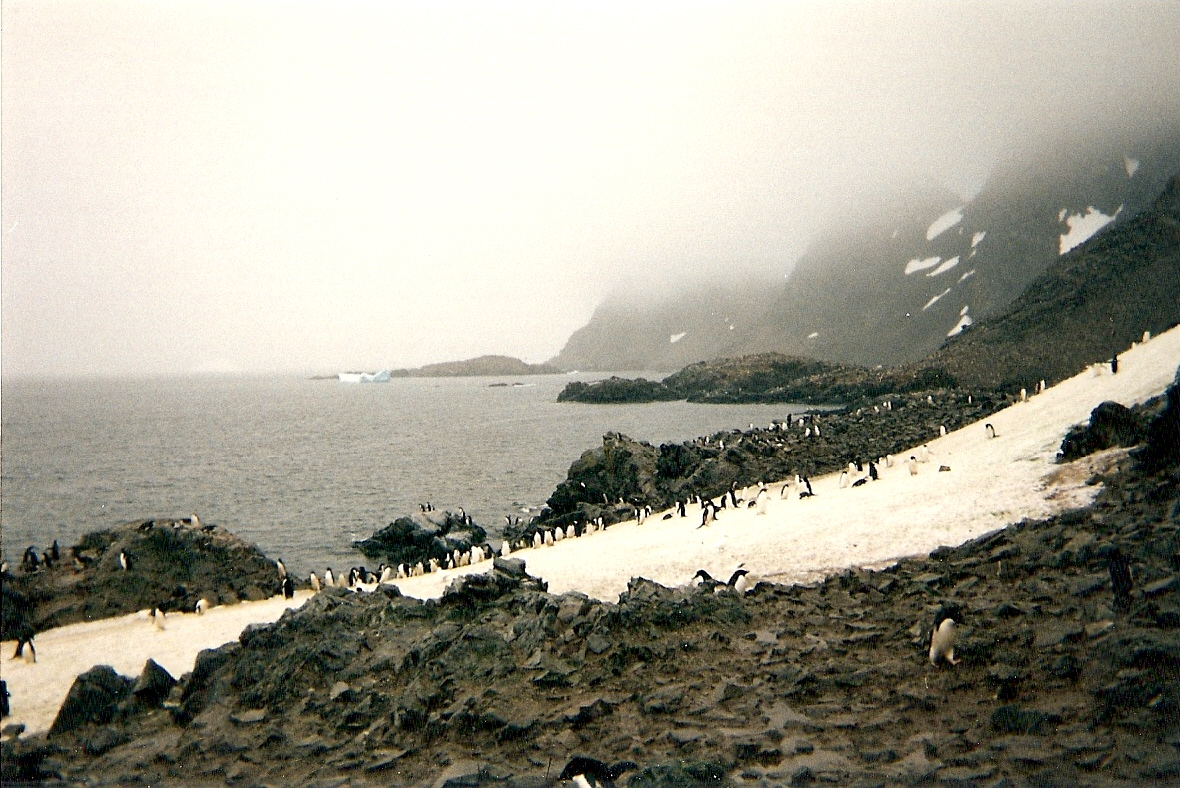
- Adélie and chinstrap penguin rookeries on Laurie Island in the South Orkney Islands, 1996.

- Location of Laurie Island in the South Orkney Islands

- Location within Antarctica

Geography
- Location: Antarctica
- Coordinates: 60°43′43″S 44°31′05″W
- Archipelago: South Orkney Islands
- Total islands: 1
- Area: 86 km^{2} (33 sq mi)

Administration
- Argentina/UK (disputed)
- Administered under the Antarctic Treaty System
- Largest settlement: Orcadas Base (pop. 28)

Demographics
- Population: 28 (2014)
- Pop. density: 0.32/km^{2} (0.83/sq mi)

Laurie Island is the second largest of the South Orkney Islands. The island is claimed by both Argentina as part of Argentine Antarctica, and by the United Kingdom as part of the British Antarctic Territory. Under the Antarctic Treaty System all sovereignty claims are suspended, as the island lies south of the parallel 60°. Buchanan Point at the north-eastern end of the island, with Cape Whitson on its south coast, are Important Bird Areas.

== History ==
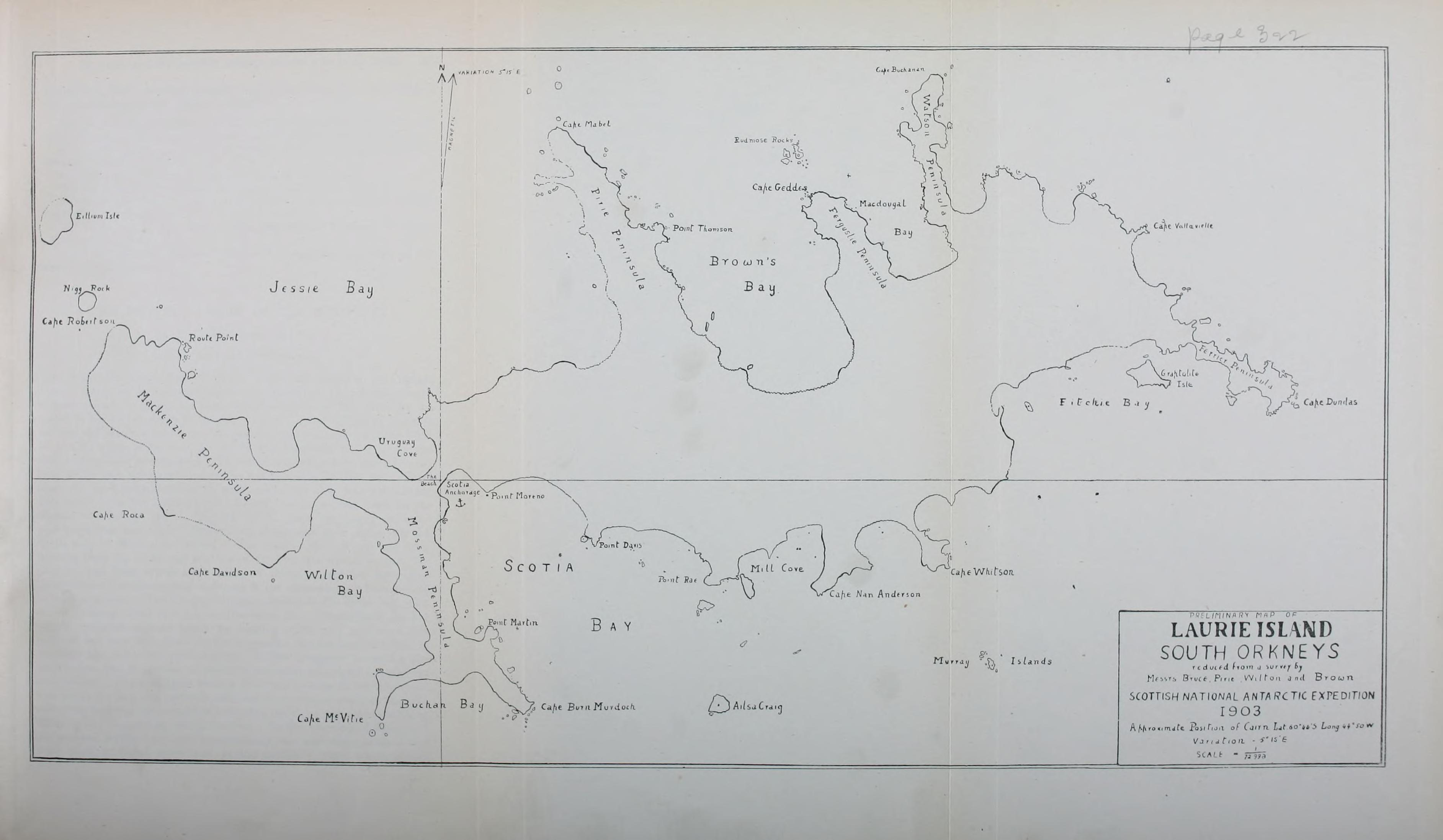
A map of Laurie Island produced by the Scottish National Antarctic Expedition of 1903

Laurie Island was discovered by Captains George Powell and Nathaniel Palmer in the course of their 1821 expedition to the South Atlantic. Richard Holmes Laurie used Powell's observations to create a map of the island, and subsequently, the island was named after him. Two years later, James Weddell mapped the island for the second time, though his charts turned out to be much less accurate than Powell's. Weddell attempted to rename the island to Melville Island for the 2nd Viscount Melville, but the name failed to stick when the Scottish National Antarctic Expedition opted for Laurie Island instead.

William S. Bruce conducted the first comprehensive scientific study of Laurie Island during the Scottish National Antarctic Expedition. Aboard his ship, the Scotia, Bruce landed on Laurie Island in March 1903. The first settlement, Omond House, was built by the crew out of stone, and would be used both as a shelter and as a post from which to study the weather.

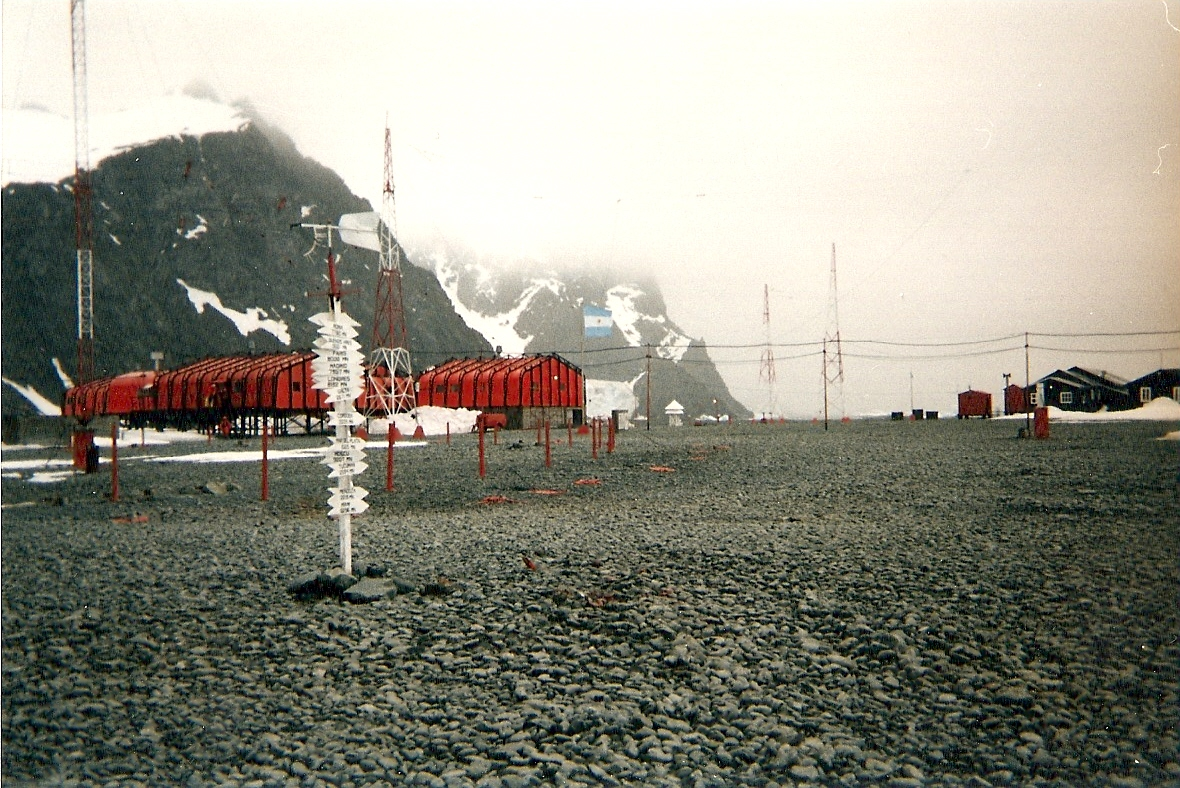
Orcadas Base

In January 1904, Bruce offered control of Omond House to the government of Argentina; the house would later be renamed Orcadas Base. The British Government had previously refused to carry on the Scottish National Antarctic Expedition's scientific studies, as they considered Laurie Island itself worthless. The expedition lacked the necessary mandate to claim the island for either Britain or Scotland. Nevertheless, Bruce's offer was accepted, and the Argentines would continue operating the meteorological station at Omond House, sending a ship each year to replenish supplies. Laurie Island would prove politically valuable to Argentina. To justify its claim to a sector of Antarctica, Argentina argued that its permanent settlement on the island demonstrated sovereignty, a key to securing a claim over a mostly desolate area. Robert Rudmose-Brown, who participated in Bruce's expedition, expressed a different view. He argued in a 1947 article that no country had the capability to govern a region as vast as Antarctica and thus no country had the standing to claim Antarctica as its own.

By 1908, Britain had come to regret its previous assessment of Laurie Island. In the Letters Patent of 1908, Britain declared a claim over the South Orkney Islands and incorporated Laurie Island into the newly created Falkland Islands Dependencies, meaning that Laurie Island would be subject to the British government in the Falklands. Argentina did not lodge a formal protest against the Letters Patent and Britain interpreted this as an acceptance of the British claim. The British position was that Bruce had given the meteorological station, but not the island itself to Argentina. The territorial dispute escalated in 1925 with the construction of an Argentinian wireless telegraph station on the island. As Argentina viewed Laurie Island as its own, the Argentine government did not request permission from the British government to operate the station, and for the first time, Argentina made an outright declaration that it had sovereignty over the island. Britain saw the possibility of strategically relinquishing the South Orkney Islands to Argentina to strengthen diplomatic relations or to secure the Falkland Islands themselves. The Argentine occupation of Laurie Island posed a problem for this strategy, as it weakened Britain's claim to the South Orkneys. Before a British cession of the South Orkney Islands could exert any leverage, Britain would have to solidify its own claim over the territory.

Laurie Island is also the site of the first post office built in the Antarctic. After William S. Bruce turned over the meteorological station to the Argentinian government, Argentina initiated postal services on 20 February 1904. The post office went inactive shortly after, until 1942, when Argentina restarted postal services, in part to assert its claim to the South Orkney Islands. In response, the British government refused to acknowledge the legitimacy of the post office. When the auxiliary cruiser HMS Carnarvon Castle visited Laurie Island on 9 February 1943, the Secretary of State for the Colonies cautioned the crew against sending letters while on shore, as doing so would undercut the British position that Argentina had no authority to establish a post office on Laurie Island in the first place.

== Geology ==
Sedimentary rocks, most notably the Greywacke-Shale Formation, constitute the bulk of Laurie Island. Dr. John H. Harvey Pirie, a geologist aboard the Scotia described the rock as "a fine-grained greywacke of a blue-grey or greenish-grey colour." The greywacke contained grains of many different minerals, quartz being the most numerous, along with plagioclase feldspar, titanite, zircon, biotite, chlorite, and veins of calcite. Pirie also found shale formations distributed across the island, usually fractured and twisted. Graptolite Island, off of Laurie Island's south-east coast, particularly exhibited these shale formations. It was on Graptolite Island that Pirie collected three fossils which he later mistook to be the remains of ancient animal organisms known as graptolites, hence the name of the island. Gertrude Elles believed that Pleurograptus was the specific species to which the graptolites belonged. Later analysis showed that the fossils on Graptolite Island were merely the remains of ancient plants.

The dating of the Greywacke-Shale Formation has proved to be a source of scientific controversy. Based on Pirie's incorrect analysis of the "graptolites", geologist I. Rafael Cordini dated the rock's genesis to the Ordovician Period. However, this explanation proved to be untenable, as Laurie Island would have been far older than had been thought possible. The reassessment of Pirie's fossils as plant remains dates the formation of the Greywacke to the Carboniferous Period, many millions of years later than originally thought.

== Places on Laurie Island ==
- Buchan Bay
- Cape Hartree
- Cape Murdoch
- Ferguslie Peninsula
- Mossman Peninsula
- Point Davis
- Route Point
- Scotia Bay
- Wilton Bay

== See also ==
- Bruce Islands
- Composite Antarctic Gazetteer
- Expedition Rock
- Florence Rock
- List of Antarctic islands south of 60° S
- SCAR
- Territorial claims in Antarctica
