= Ewer Pass =

Ewer Pass (60°43′S 44°32′W) is a pass rising to about 200 metres (660 ft), trending north-northwest–south-southeast between Browns Bay and Aitken Cove on Laurie Island, in the South Orkney Islands. It was named by the UK Antarctic Place-names Committee in 1987 after John R. Ewer, a Falklands Islands Dependencies Survey meteorological observer at Cape Geddes, Laurie Island, January–March 1947, and at Deception Island, 1947–48; he a member of the party that crossed Laurie Island via this pass.
