= Cape Robertson =

Headland of Antarctica

- Cape
- Coordinates: 60°44′S 44°48′W

Cape Robertson is a cape which marks the west side of the entrance to Jessie Bay, in the north-west part of Laurie Island, in the South Orkney Islands of Antarctica.

It lies 2 km (1.2 mi) east of Route Point at the north end of Mackenzie Peninsula. On the map of Laurie Island by the Scottish National Antarctic Expedition under Bruce, 1902–04, the name Cape Robertson appears in the position of Route Point, previously named by Captain George Powell and Captain Nathaniel Palmer in 1821. The name Route Point is retained for the north-west end of Mackenzie Peninsula; Cape Robertson is the north-east extremity. It is named for Thomas Robertson, captain of the Scotia, expedition ship of the ScotNAE.

== Important Bird Area ==
Some 388 ha of the site has been identified as an Important Bird Area (IBA) by BirdLife International because it supports a large breeding colony of about 20,000 pairs of chinstrap penguins.

== See also ==
- Expedition Rock
