= Station C =

Station C might refer to one of two British Antarctic Survey research bases:

- Station C on Sandefjord Bay, Coronation Island
- Station C on Ferguslie Peninsula, Laurie Island
