= Baldred Rock =

Baldred Rock (60°44′S 44°26′W) is a rock in Fitchie Bay at Laurie Island in the South Orkney Islands. It lies close off the south side of Ferrier Peninsula, 0.75 nautical miles (1.4 km) east-southeast of Graptolite Island. This rock was mapped by the Scottish National Antarctic Expedition under William Speirs Bruce, 1902–04, and was later named "Bass Rock" owing to its likeness to the Bass Rock in Scotland. The name Bass Rock has also appeared on charts as an alternative name for an island in the Joinville Island group. To avoid confusion of these names, in 1954 the UK Antarctic Place-Names Committee recommended an entirely new name for the rock at Fitchie Bay. Baldred Rock is named after Saint Baldred, the first hermit known to have lived on the Scottish Bass Rock.
