= Whaling in Norway =

Whaling in Norway involves hunting of minke whales for use as animal and human food in Norway and for export to Japan. Whale hunting has been a part of Norwegian coastal culture for centuries, and commercial operations targeting the minke whale have occurred since the early 20th century. Some still continue the practice in the modern day, within annual quotas.

== History ==
Norwegians caught whales off the coast of Tromsø as early as the 9th or 10th century. Vikings from Norway also introduced whaling methods for driving small cetaceans, like pilot whales, into fjords in Iceland. The Norse sagas, and other ancient documents, provide few details on Norwegian whaling. The sagas recount some disputes between families over dead whales but do not describe any organized whale fishery in Norway.

Spear-drift whaling was practised in the North Atlantic as early as the 12th century. In open boats, hunters would strike a whale with a marked spear, with the intent of later locating the dead beached whale to claim a rightful share.

=== Svalbard ===
From the early 17th century through the 18th century, Basque whalers hunted as far north as Svalbard and Bear Island, to include participation in Dutch and English whaling expeditions there. Competition between nations led to over-exploitation of whale stocks and multiple armed naval conflicts in the early 17th century. By the middle of the 17th century, other European nations also hunted whales in these lucrative waters.

The whales were primarily hunted to render oil from the blubber for production of soap, paint, varnish, oil for illumination, and more. The baleen, or whalebone, was also used in products like corsets and umbrellas. On arrival at Spitsbergen, the whalers would set anchor, then construct a shore station with materials from the ship. The whales were spotted from shore, then chased and lanced repeatedly from the bow of a shallop. The whale carcass was next towed back to the shore station where the blubber was removed and boiled down. Finally, the whale oil was stored in wooden casks which were loaded onto the anchored ship.

The Dutch used Jan Mayen Island as a base for whaling. They also established a semi-permanent shore station in the early 17th century on Amsterdam Island, Svalbard, which became the village of Smeerenburg. Norwegian ships were also sent to Svalbard during the 18th century.

=== Modern whaling ===
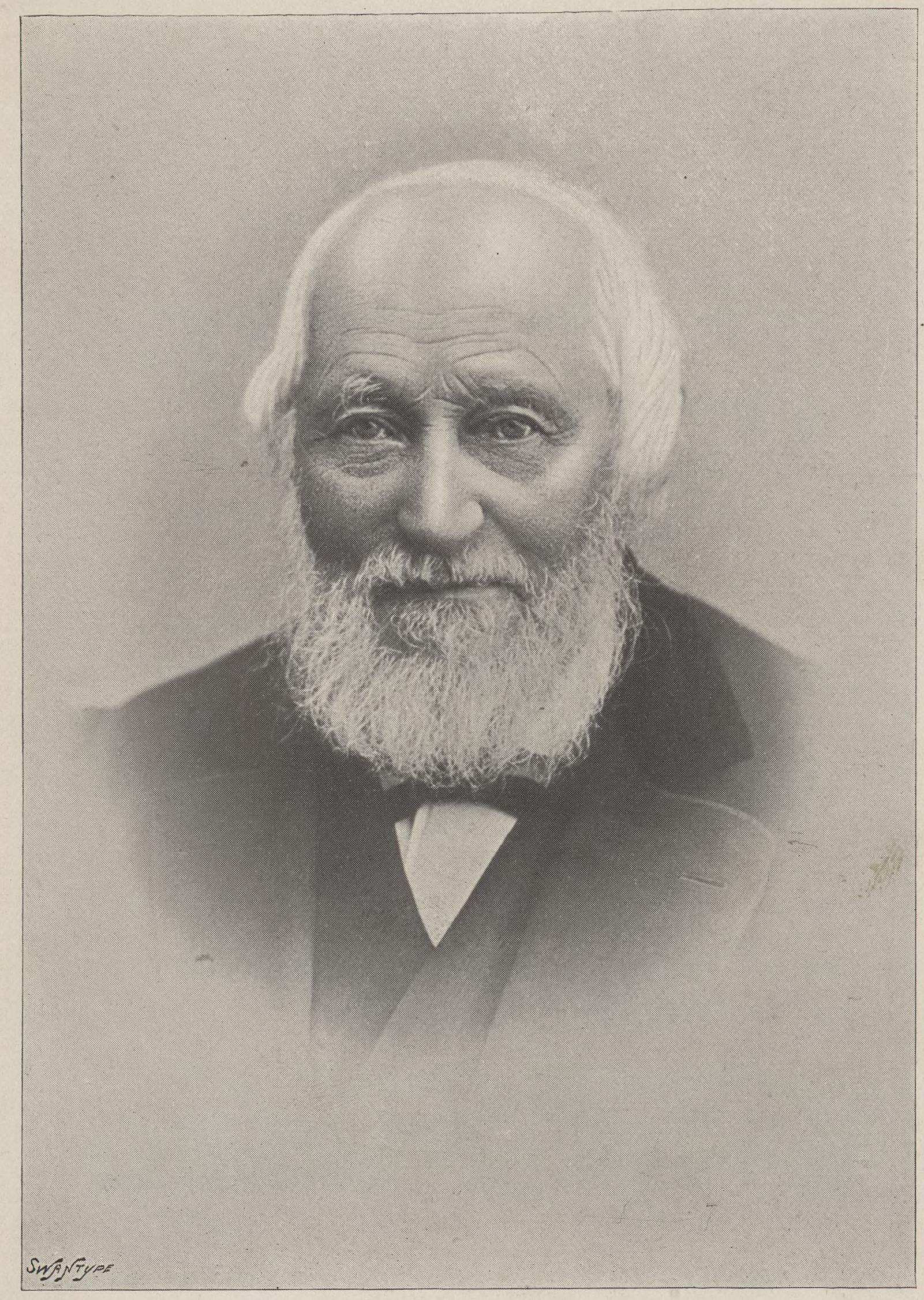
Svend Foyn (1809–1894)

New techniques and technologies developed in the mid 19th century which revolutionized the whaling industry and Norway's prominence as a whaling nation.

In 1865, Thomas Welcome Roys and C. A. Lilliendahl, tested their experimental rocket harpoon design and set up a shore station in Seyðisfjörður, Iceland. A slump in oil prices after the American Civil War forced their endeavor into bankruptcy in 1867. A Norwegian, Svend Foyn, also studied the American method in Iceland.

Svend Foyn, who came to be considered the 'Father of modern whaling', was born in Tønsberg in 1809. After years of experiments and expeditions, he patented the modern whaling harpoon in 1870, the basic design of which is still in use today. He perceived the failings of other methods and solved these problems in his own system. He included, with the help of H.M.T. Esmark, a grenade tip that exploded inside the whale. This harpoon design also utilized a shaft that was connected to the head with a moveable joint. His original cannons were muzzle-loaded with special padding and also used a unique form of gunpowder. The cannons were later replaced with safer breech-loading types.

In 1864, Foyn took his first whaling ship to Finnmark but was unsuccessful and only caught a few whales. However, with the 1870 introduction of his improved harpoon design, and powered ships, larger rorquals could be chased and killed with new and deadly efficiency.

There were many others whose ideas predated Foyn's method. In 1867, a Danish fireworks manufacturer, Gaetano Amici, patented a cannon fired harpoon. An Englishman, George Welch, patented a grenade harpoon, also in 1867, very similar to Foyn's invention. In 1856, Phillip Rechten, of Bremen, Germany, together with the gunsmith Cordes, produced a double-barreled whale gun (and later claimed credit for Foyn's success) with a separate harpoon and bomb lance. Another Norwegian, Jacob Nicolai Walsøe experimented with an explosive tipped projectile design. A third Norwegian, Arent Christian Dahl, also experimented with explosive harpoons from 1857 to 1860.

From 1873 to 1883, Foyd enjoyed a whaling monopoly granted to him by the Norwegian government to protect him from German competitors. He moved his whaling operation from Tønsberg to Vadsø, and enjoyed great success in spite of frequent disputes between the whalers and the people of Vadsø, including fishermen who blamed the whalers for poor catches. He also established guano factories rather than letting the stripped whale carcasses go to waste. Attempts to market the meat for domestic consumption were unsuccessful.

Regardless of the monopoly, in 1876, some Norwegian citizens formed another whaling company and hunted whales from a site at the Varanger fjord where the Germans had initially established themselves. After a court dispute, Foyn made concessions to several other whaling companies, including the first modern whaling company in Sandefjord. When the monopoly ended, Norwegian competitors multiplied, the number of whaling stations and ships doubled, and whale stocks suffered dramatically due to unrestricted catching. Fin whales and blue whales were favored targets with 1,046 fin and 148 blue killed just from 1885 to 1886. Small boat whalers also hunted bottlenose whales in large numbers. By 1890, up to seventy vessels claimed about 3,000 of the 30 ft long whales annually.

Svend Foyn died in 1894 at the age of eighty-five.

=== Whaling ban ===
In 1878, an extremely poor fishing season prompted renewed objections to whaling. A public scientific committee recommended a closed whaling season from January through May. In 1880, the Norwegian Parliament debated and adopted the proposal. A ban on whale catching, in the Varanger fjord, would take place from 1 Jan to 31 May for a period of five years starting in January 1881. Whaling grew in economic importance to Norway, but by 1883, poor fishing catches brought renewed calls for a total ban. The closed season was renewed for another 5 years, from 1886 through 1890.

"In the profound conviction of the destructive effect of whaling on the fisheries along the coast of Finnmark, and seriously concerned for the future of themselves and the District, several hundred fishermen appeal to the Government to give the proposal for a Whale Protection Act its full support."

Fishermen stepped up their pressure on the government after more dismal catches in 1886 and 1887, and an excellent catch in 1889 did not deter their opposition. Whaling companies used the 1889 success as an opportunity to condemn all restrictions on the industry, but the closed season was extended for another five years to 1896.

The conflict between whalers and fishermen had become a significant political issue by the 1900 election. Varanger fishing, where whaling was most intense, from 1901 to 1903, went even worse for the economic hardship of fishermen. As the disputes shifted into a class struggle, Russian competition and agitation shaped the official response. Politicians were also increasingly concerned about losing the votes of so many fishermen. Then, in June 1903, fishermen destroyed a whaling station of the Tanen Whaling Company in the "Menhaven Riots". A bill was passed before the end of the year banning all whaling in Norway's three northernmost counties for a period of 10 years, beginning February 1, 1904.

=== Iceland ===
In 1883, whaling expanded from Norwegian waters to Iceland as unrestricted catching depleted whale stocks off the coast of Norway. Svend Foyn made several attempts to profit from whaling in Iceland but was ultimately unsuccessful. In reaction to demands that Norwegians working in Iceland should become naturalized Icelandic (and therefore Danish) subjects, Foyn sold his shares to company partners and abandoned his plans for whaling in Iceland. The major shareholder, Thomas Amlie of Oslo, assumed the role of expedition manager and enjoyed great success. As a result, competing companies transferred their operations to Iceland. In a violent storm in 1897, Amlie was lost at sea with one of his whaling ships and all 32 hands. He died at the age of 82. Amlie is considered the father of modern whaling in Iceland.

Between 1883 and 1915 ten (mostly Norwegian) whaling companies were founded and operated 14 shore stations on the east and west coasts of Iceland. One of the most successful companies, managed by Hans Ellefsen of Vestfold, in its best year produced ¼ of all of the whale oil in Iceland. He also used whale carcasses stripped of their blubber as raw material for a guano factory. However, in response to the decline of whale stocks, Ellefsen moved his operation to South Africa in 1911.

=== Faroe Islands ===
In 1894, Hans Albert Grøn of Sandefjord established the first of seven whaling stations in the Faroe Islands at Gjánoyri, near Langasandur on Streymoy. There, his whaling company was able to take advantage of the migrating blue, fin, and sei whales that passed by the Faroes each year.

Unlike Iceland and northern Norway, where fishermen opposed the industry, the Faroese embraced whaling and enjoyed the new source of cheap whale meat. The Danish government insisted by law that whaling must be reserved for Danish citizens or companies in which Danes were significant shareholders. In 1901, Grøn established another station and a Danish-Norwegian company which operated from a base near Tórshavn.

Peder Bogen founded A/S Suderø, originally in Sandefjord, as another Danish-Norwegian venture in 1901. In 1908 he built a guano factory and used the product to endure seasons with poor yields or low whale oil prices. Competition continued to increase and as many as six shore stations operated from 1906 to 1911. After production peaked in 1909, Grøn left the Faroes in 1911 only to lose several ships at sea, including a floating factory. Grøn returned for successful 1914–15 seasons but was unable to make a significant catch in 1916. From 1917 to 1920, World War I interrupted whaling in the Norwegian Sea, and it was hoped that whale stocks had recovered in that time. Whale oil prices had dropped in 1920 along with the possibility of profitable whaling. Regardless, one Norwegian company continued to operate in the Faroes until the 1930s.

=== Shetland Islands ===
In 1903, Peder Bogen of Sandefjord and Christian Nielsen of Larvik, brought their whaling companies to the Shetland Islands. At first, the whalers were welcomed by local herring fishermen whose nets were often damaged by whales. After the first season of whaling, and poor herring catches, the fishermen turned against the whalers. The fishermen believed the offal and blood from whale carcasses attracted sharks and frightened the herring. In 1904, an official committee was unable to determine any link between whaling and herring stocks. Although catches had suffered for years, fishermen insisted on blaming the whalers and protests led to many new restrictions. After the World War I stoppage, in 1920, renewed objections to whaling persuaded the Norwegian companies to leave.

=== Hebrides and Ireland ===
In 1904, a Norwegian whaling company built the Bunaveneader station in Harris and caught North Atlantic right whales there for the next decade. After the World War I stoppage, whaling resumed there with a successful season in 1920. The success was short lived and the company was sold in 1922.

In 1907, a Norwegian-British whaling company, Arranmore Whaling, named for the island of Arran, was founded. However, local fishermen opposed the whalers immediately and the company was forced to set up its station 90 miles away at the Inishkea Islands. Another Norwegian-British company, Blacksod Whaling Company Ltd., also set up near Inishkea in 1910. Arranmore folded in 1913. After the World War I stoppage, Blacksod continued for one good season but its station burned down in February 1922, ending whaling out of Ireland.

=== Return to Svalbard ===
In 1903, A/S Ørnen, established by Norwegian shipowner Christen Christensen of Sandefjord, sent an expedition to Svalbard to conduct whaling with a steam powered floating factory. Christensen's own shipyard fitted a small wooden steam ship for the task, the Telegraf. Weather and the storage capacity of the ship limited the success of the expedition. A second ship, Admiralen, was purchased for the following season.

Competition increased and by 1905 as many as eight companies operated from Svalbard to Bear Island, catching large numbers of blue whales, well outside of Norway's jurisdiction and whaling regulations. A/S Ørnen closed its operation and Admiralen sailed to Antarctica. Other Norwegian companies sent their floating factories south as well. From 1907 to 1908, four more companies closed down. The remaining three continued until 1912 when poor catches forced them out, with losses, as well. Two more unsuccessful attempts would be made in the 1920s.

=== Newfoundland ===
Adolph Neilsen of Tønesberg brought modern whaling to Newfoundland through his Cabot Steam Whaling Company in 1898. With a shore station in Notre Dame Bay, the company caught blue, fin, sei, and humpback whales. To continue the hunt in winter months, another station was set up on Hermitage Bay. A local competitor established two additional stations in 1901 but was completely dependent on Norwegian equipment and gunners.

After the first season, local fishermen voiced opposition to the whalers with fears that their fisheries would be ruined, nets destroyed by panicked whales, and those who lived close to the shore stations complained of the stench. The Department of Fisheries expressed concerns over the dramatic decline of whales in Norway's own waters. However, local competition in Newfoundland increased significantly and by 1904, fourteen stations were in production with four more in 1905. Predictably, over-hunting led to poor returns and in 1906 the sole Norwegian company folded. By 1910, only five whaling companies remained. While losses were incurred by local whaling companies, Norwegian catching equipment and crews were widely used which ultimately benefited Norway.

=== Japan ===
In 1898, Jūrō Oka (father of modern Japanese whaling) toured the world to learn about modern whaling. He traveled to Norway for harpoons and cannons, and returned to Japan to establish its first modern whaling company, Nihon Enyo Gyogyo K.K. (later named Toyo Hogei K.K.). February 4, 1900, Oka's Norwegian gunner, Morten Pedersen, shot the first whale. Pedersen had previously worked with the Russians and was employed with a lucrative three-year contract. Other Norwegian whalers found employment with Japanese companies as well. Norwegian newspapers expressed concerns over the creation of a fierce foreign competitor with Norwegian assistance.

Oka also leased and purchased modern whaling ships from Norwegian companies, starting with the Olga, the Rex and the Regina. When the Olga was later sold, its gunner was sent to Oslo to contract the construction of a new catcher, the Togo, which was delivered in 1906 as the first of many whaling ships built in Norwegian shipyards for Japan. Some of the Norwegian built whaling ships from businesses that failed in Newfoundland were also bought by Japanese companies.

=== Alaska ===
Norwegian and Scottish investors established the United States Whaling Co. in Sandefjord in 1910 with Peder Bogen as its managing director. The company built three whaling ships in Seattle (to avoid delays in production) and leased a steamer to use as a floating factory. Baranof Island was the site of its shore station. The factory ship was condemned by locals who claimed foreigners would destroy whale stocks with cheap Norwegian labor. Catches produced only a small fraction of the expected oil revenue in its first year.

Another business, the Alaska Whaling Co., was established in 1911 by investors from Norway (including Lars Christensen) and Norwegian-Americans. The company's shore station was set up in Akutan – an island in the Aleutians. Fishermen protested against the floating factory and biologists raised concerns for the survival of gray and bowhead whales.

The Alaska Whaling Co. purchased the Admiralen (first steam powered factory ship to be used in Antarctica in 1905) for its floating factory in 1912. However, even with two catchers built in Seattle, production did not meet expectations and additional losses were incurred. In 1913 the company became the North Pacific Sea Products Co. with an all American board.

Norwegian companies caught large numbers of blue whales and profited from a wartime increase in the price of whale oil from 1915 to 1918. However, the boom ended in 1919 with a sharp decline in oil prices and a shrinking market in the U.S. resulting in bankruptcy.

=== Chile ===
Adolf Amandus Andresen immigrated to Chile in 1894 where he prospered as a tugboat captain. He later returned to Norway to learn about the whaling industry in Finnmark. In 1903 Andresen, with a harpoon cannon mounted on one of his tugboats, shot his first whale in Chilean waters. He later managed the Sociedad Ballenera de Magallanes (the Magellan Whaling Company) with a shore station in Bahía Aguila.

Andresen's 1907 catch of 79 right whales drew competition to the area though the success went unmatched. In 1914 he set out from San Pedro with a factory ship, Sobraon, and two catchers to hunt humpbacks along the coast from Chile, Peru, Ecuador and on to Colombia following the migrating animals. Andresen was the first person to raise the Chilean flag on Antarctica. However, his whaling business ultimately failed as a result of economic depression and the collapsing world market for whale oil.

Encouraged by Andresen, another Norwegian whaler, Christen Christensen, sent the Vesterlide to San Pedro, captained by his own son, to hunt blue whales in the Bay of Corcovado. Christensen also financially backed another whaling company, Sociedad Ballenera y Pescadora, which was operated by H.C. Korsholm in Valdivia. Unfortunately, the returns were inadequate and both companies were liquidated by 1913.

=== Commercial whaling ===
Recently, the Norwegian whaling industry has met increasing difficulties because of falling demand and weak recruitment. Norwegian anti-whaling groups seem to prefer to hold a low profile and watch over the slow death of the industry, instead of raising their voice and polarizing the debate.

In the last decade or two, some Norwegian scientists, veterinarians and technicians have made many contributions to the improvement of whale killing technologies, methods, and regulations, which have led to more humane outcomes for hunted whales (such as improvements in time to death and instantaneous death rate).

Only minke whaling is currently permitted, from a population of 107,000 animals in the North East Atlantic and is argued by proponents and government officials to be sustainable. Still, it has been frequently criticized by the international community, environmentalists and animal rights groups as Norway, along with Iceland and Japan, is one of very few countries that still allows whaling.

Norway registered an objection to the International Whaling Commission (IWC) commercial whaling moratorium, and is thus not bound by it. In 1993, Norway resumed a commercial catch, following a period of five years where a small catch was made under scientific permit. Norwegian minke whale catches have fluctuated between 218 animals in 1995 and 646 in 2003.

During the decade immediately prior to the moratorium, Norway caught around 2,000 minke whales per year. The North Atlantic hunt is divided into five areas and usually lasts from early May to late August. Norway has exported a limited amount of whale meat to the Faroes and Iceland. It has been attempting to export to Japan for several years and this was realized in 2009.

In May 2004, the Norwegian Parliament passed a resolution to considerably increase the number of minkes hunted each year. The Ministry of Fisheries also initiated a satellite tracking program of various whale species to monitor migration patterns and diving behavior. The tagging research program has been under way since 1999.

In 2018, when the Norwegian whaling quota was increased by 30%, a quota of 1,278 minke whales a year was set, which applied up to 2021. Since the 1993 hunt resumption the Norwegian quota has rarely been fully met. Since 2016 the annual catch has fluctuated between 400 and 600 minke whales; 429 whales were caught in 2019, the lowest number for decades. Only 12 whaling vessels participated in the whale hunt in 2020, compared with 34 in 2004. In an attempt to increase the production of whale meat, the Norwegian government eased legal restrictions in 2020. The quota was reduced to 917 in 2022, and 580 minke whales were killed that year.

== Consumption and subsidies ==
=== Consumption ===
Whale meat captured in Norway is primarily eaten by humans. In 2014 113 metric tonnes of offal and other byproducts were sold to make animal feed for the fur industry. Whale meat is also used as a niche product for pet food in Norway. According to opinion polls by Opinion in 2009 and 2010, about 80% of Norwegians have eaten whale meat. About 32% ate it once or twice a year. 7% (2009) or "under 5%" (2010) of Norwegians eat whale meat often (more than once a month). In 2018 about 153 tonnes of whale meat was exported to Japan, and 200 tonnes in 2019.

=== Subsidies ===
The Norwegian government formerly paid subsidies equal to about half the value of whales caught; subsidies are no longer paid.

== Production ==
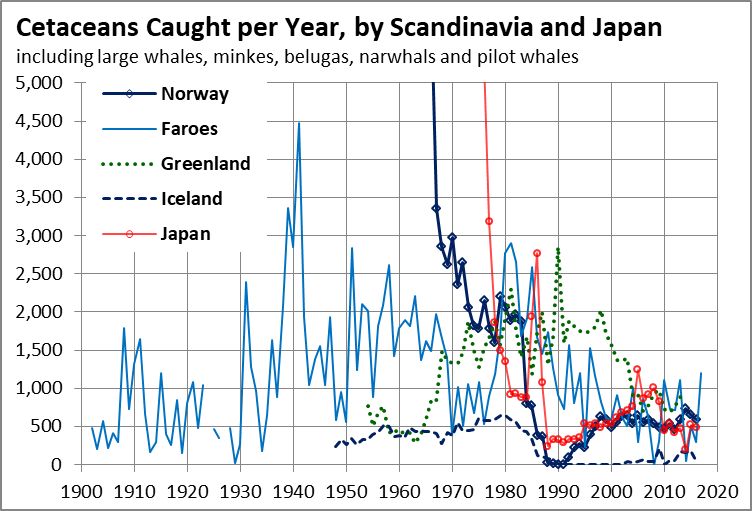
Whales caught per year

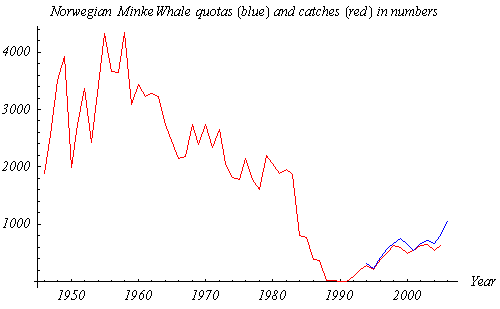
Norwegian whale catches (red line) and quotas (blue line, 1994–2006), from Norwegian statistics

Modern minke whaling is conducted by many small to medium-sized fishing boats in spring and summer seasons. These vessels are equipped with a 50 mm (2.0 in) or 60 mm (2.4 in) harpoon cannon and penthrite grenade tipped harpoons designed to explode inside the whale. Each harpoon is connected to a nylon line and through a system of springs to a winch.

The boats search known whaling grounds surrounding the coast of Norway at 4-6 knots watching for signs of feeding whales or flocks of birds eating krill. When a whale is spotted the gunner attempts to shoot the whale in its side, near the thorax, as the animal surfaces to blow. If the whale does not appear to die immediately the animal is hauled up to the boat where whalers with rifles will attempt to finish the animal with a shot to the head. In rare cases, a second harpoon shot may be necessary, but this is quite rare.

When the dead minke whale is alongside of the boat a wire or rope is secured to the tail and the animal is pulled onto the deck through a gate on the gunwale. The whale is butchered at sea and the meat and blubber is then packed in ice and stored on the boat to be processed later on shore.

=== Catches ===
Norway has caught hundreds of whales per year since 1985. The former Fisheries Minister, Per Sandberg, of the Progress Party said in 2018, "I want to make sure that the whaling remains alive." However the number of active Norwegian whaling boats has dropped from 350 in 1949 to around 20 in 2016 and 11 in 2017.

IWC – Norway Minke Whale Catches Under Objection (1985–2017)

Year	1985	1986	1987	1988-92	1993	1994	1995	1996	1997	1998	1999	2000	2001	2002	2003	2004	2005	2006	2007	2008	2009	2010	2011	2012	2013	2014	2015	2016	2017	2018	2019	2020	2021	2022	2023
Catch	771	379	373	0	157	206	218	388	503	625	591	487	552	634	647	544	639	545	597	536	484	468	533	464	594	736	660	591	432	454	429	484	577	581	507

IWC – Norway Minke Whale Special Permit Catches (1988–1994)

Year	1988	1989	1990	1991	1992	1993	1994
Catch	29	17	5	0	95	69	74

=== Education and training of hunters ===
Norwegian whaling is subject to strict and detailed regulations concerning all aspects of the whaling activities. There are rules for hunting seasons, quotas, equipment and monitoring. The permission to go whaling is given on an annual basis, and there are certain requirements that must be met in order to get a licence.

One of the most important conditions is the unconditional requirement of having passed the obligatory course for licence holders and gunners. The training courses are mandatory and arranged by the Directorate of Fisheries.

Each year prior to the beginning of each hunting season, the hunters are required to pass obligatory shooting tests, both with rifle and harpoon guns.

=== Whale grenades ===
Due to the expense of explosive charges and the relatively small size of minke whales, cold (non-explosive) harpoons were used by Norwegian minke whalers up to 1984. The Norwegian College of Veterinary Science (Norges veterinærhøgskole - NVH) conducted experiments to develop a new explosive tipped harpoon that could reduce the average time to death.

Four types of "whale grenades" were developed using the explosive penthrite. Two of these were made for 50 mm (2 in) and 60 mm (2 in) cannons, one for 90 mm (4 in) cannons for Icelanders hunting fin and sei whales, and one for the darting guns used by Alaskan subsistence whalers. In 2000, an improved model called Hvalgranat-99 (Whalegrenade-99), previously developed in cooperation with the Norwegian Defence Research Establishment (Forsvarets forskningsinstitutt - FFI), was put into production and is currently used by Norway, Iceland, Greenland and Japan. The development of this technology was funded by the Norwegian Ministry of Fisheries which recovered the cost through the sale of whale grenades.

A study in 1985-1986 showed that the introduction of the penthrite grenade prototype increased the instantaneous death rate (IDR) of minke whales from 17% to 45%. In 2000, the improved Whalegrenade-99 became mandatory and, combined with better training, further increased the IDR to 80% in all three subsequent whaling seasons.

== Controversy ==
=== Opposition ===
Animal rights, environmental and anti-whaling groups have commented that Norway's economic position makes it paradoxical that it is one of very few countries actively engaged in, and favoring the continuation of, commercial whaling. This is despite the argued negligible contribution that whaling makes to the economy, and despite international opposition.

According to documents released by WikiLeaks, former US president Barack Obama, who promised to oppose whaling during his presidential campaign, used diplomatic channels to put pressure on Norway during his visit for the conferment of the 2009 Nobel Peace Prize.

=== Support ===
Pro-whaling entities, such as the North Atlantic Marine Mammal Commission, have commented that it is a violation of sovereign rights to impose anti-whaling regulations on an independent state, and raise concerns about those nations' factory farming operations, which they see as considerably more harmful than whaling. Many supporters of whaling agree that its macroeconomic importance is negligible, but hold that the livelihood of individuals and small firms depend on it and that sustainable development depends on human harvesting of all non-endangered species, and that it is an important part of culture in coastal areas. Arne Kalland argues that international pressure against whaling is a form of cultural imperialism imposed on Norway.

While not actively supporting whaling, several Norwegian environmental groups have stated that they oppose extreme measures, specifically sabotage, against the whaling industry.

=== International Legal Status ===
Because the government of Norway maintains an objection to paragraph 10(e) (the section referring to the 1986 moratorium) of the International Convention for the Regulation of Whaling (ICRW), the paragraph is not binding upon the Norwegian government, and thus the 1986 IWC global moratorium does not apply to them.
