= Blue Whale Unit =

Unit of measurement formerly used in whaling

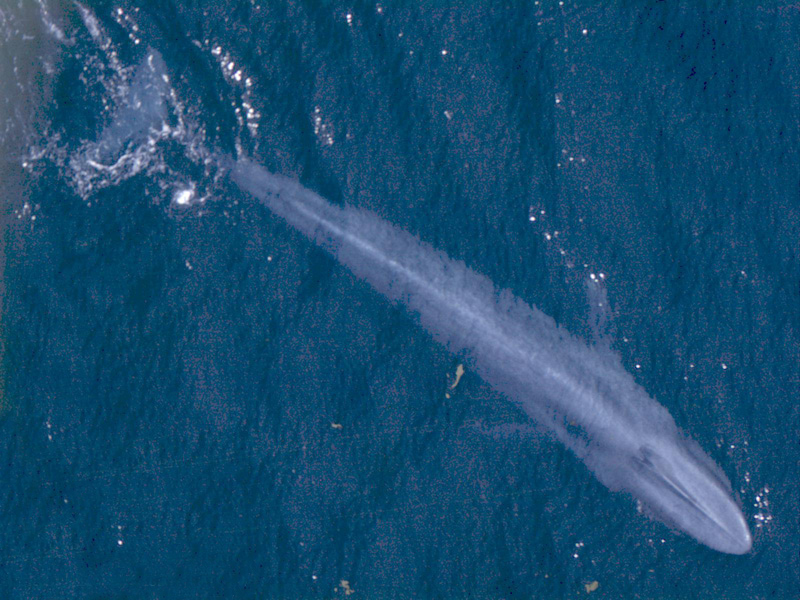
Blue whale

A Blue Whale Unit (BWU) was a unit of measurement based on the whale oil yield of an average blue whale, created in 1932 by whalers to control whale oil prices, and used by the International Whaling Commission from 1946 to 1972 in an attempt to regulate whaling.

== Origin ==
Fin whale

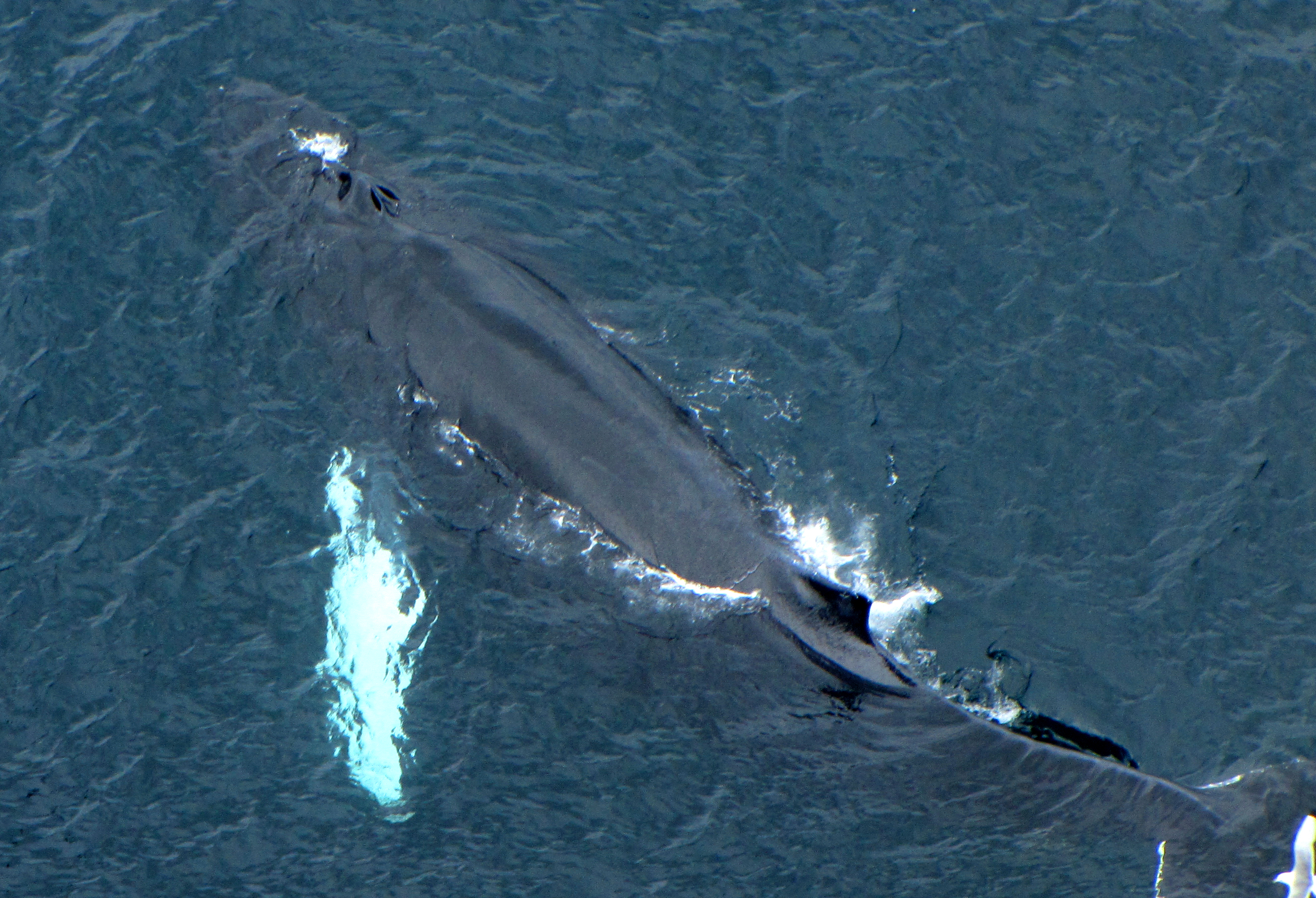
Humpback whale

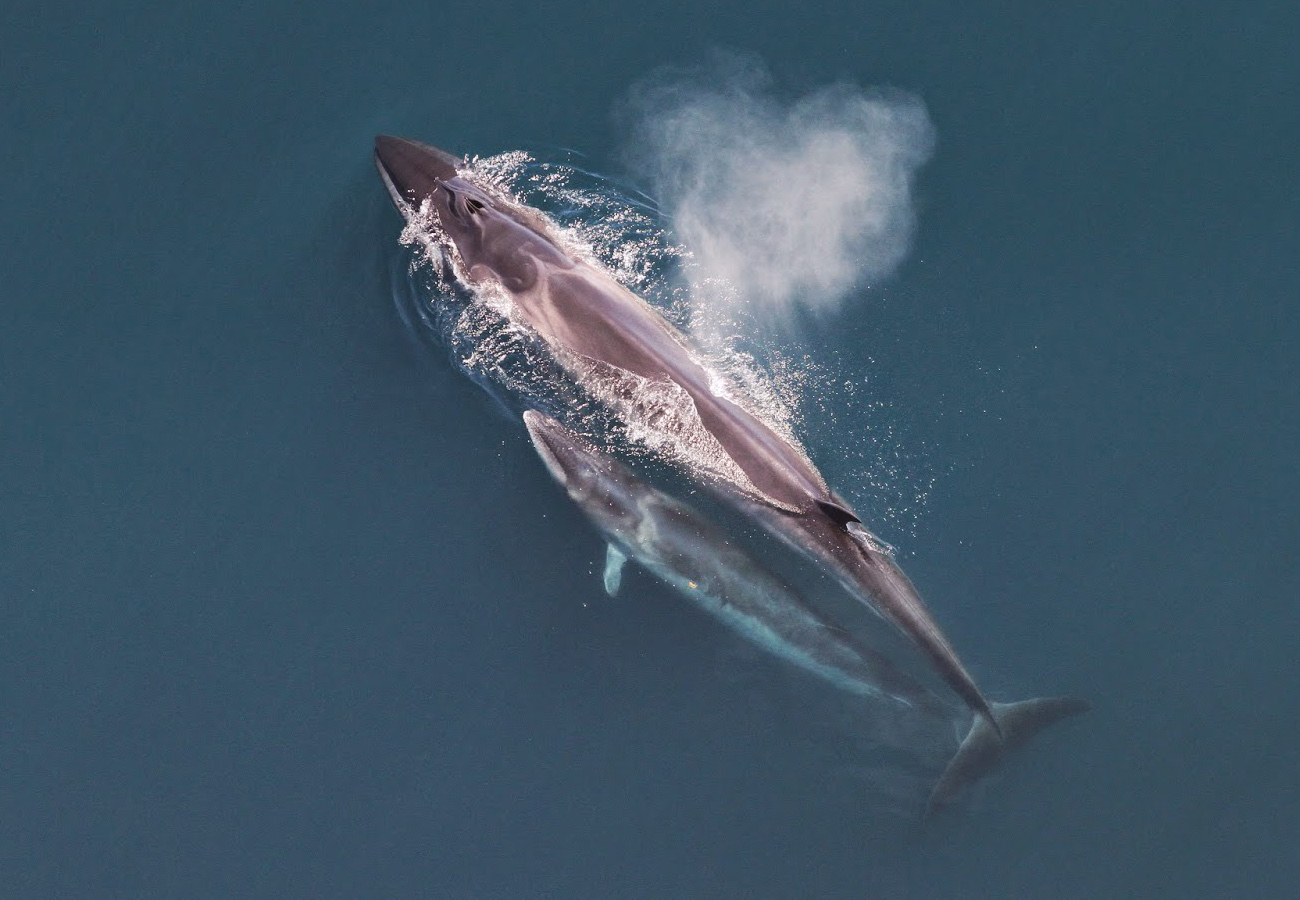
Sei whale

The Blue Whale Unit was devised in 1932 by a cartel of whaling companies in the Antarctic Ocean, in response to the rapid increase in production of whale oil in the 1920s and the consequent glut and price drop. With the lack of international restrictions on whaling, the whaling companies attempted self-regulation. They preferred catch limits to be set based on the amount of product harvested, rather than number of whales killed—these resulting "barrel quotas" were designed to control prices and prevent oversupply. A BWU was intended to roughly quantify the amount of oil each species of whale could yield: whalers agreed that a blue whale (Balaenoptera musculus) would nominally give 110 barrels of oil, (Note: This quantity is not linked to the modern oil barrel unit used for petroleum, which is 42 US gallons (160 L; 35 imp gal). The barrels used for whale oil were 40 US gal (150 L; 33 imp gal) in capacity. Thus, one BWU was about 4,400 US gal (17,000 L; 3,700 imp gal).) one BWU was then deemed the equivalent of two fin whales (B. physalus), two and a half humpback whales (Megaptera novaeangliae), or six sei whales (B. borealis). Although an imprecise and "scientifically dubious" measure, it served to change the focus of whaling from the number of individual animals killed to their total economic value. The cartel set a BWU quota for each of its members, who were then free to fill it using whatever species they chose; although this reduced the amount of whale oil entering the market, its price did not subsequently increase, and the cartel fell apart within two years.

In 1944, the whaling nations adopted the BWU as a tool for regulating the annual whale catch, regardless of which species were being caught. Once the annual quota had been met by all nations combined, whaling would cease for that season. A quota of 16,000 BWU was set for the 1945–46 Antarctic season—two thirds of the annual catch in the last seven pre-war years, suggested by three scientists as a "reassuring" value. In 1946–47 this quota was increased to 34,720 BWU, and in 1947–48 to 43,478.

== Use by International Whaling Commission ==
The BWU was adopted by the International Whaling Commission in 1946 as a basis for setting whale quotas under the International Convention for the Regulation of Whaling, turning a measure invented to control whale oil production into one for conserving whale numbers. Although the IWC returned to the 16,000 BWU quota used in 1944, the effect of the BWU was to incentivize faster and more technologically sophisticated whaling, as nations competed to capture as much of this quota as possible before the season was closed. These "Whale Olympics" increased both the number of catcher boats (from 129 in the 1946–47 season to 263 in 1951–52) and the amount of waste in whale processing.

Negotiations over whaling became debates over the BWU allowance for each coming season—for years, delegates wrangled over 14,500 versus 15,000 BWU while the scientific committee recommended 10,000 or 11,000; in 1957, with the evidence of declining whale numbers, the Antarctic quota was reduced to 14,500 BWU. By the 1960s, when the focus of whaling had shifted from oil to whale meat, whalers preferred to harvest bigger whales rather than a larger number of smaller oil-rich whales, and so the BWU quota accelerated the decline of blue and fin whales. The system also obscured changes in species composition of the whale harvest: as blue whales became increasingly rare, whalers were able to switch to the next-largest fin whales, and then—when those too were depleted—to sei whales, while maintaining the same total BWU catch—although in most years the allowable catch was exceeded. Because the BWU only measured the economic value of the whale stock, it did nothing to encourage whalers to shift their efforts towards species that were less exploited.

Though the 1960s the IWC's Scientific Committee advised rejecting the BWU as a system of measurement, without success. In 1963 an IWC-appointed scientific "Committee of Three" recommended a ban on hunting blue and humpback whales, a maximum harvest of 7000 fin whales, and the abolition of the BWU. The whaling nations rejected these proposals. An IWC review of Antarctic whale populations in 1965 led to the total protection of blue and humpback whales, and in addition recommended abandoning the BWU—but this recommendation was again not adopted. By 1971 with declining whale stocks the annual catch limit had been reduced to 2,300 BWU. After being strongly criticised as a scientifically inaccurate and antiquated measure, the BWU was finally replaced in 1972 by the "New Management Procedure", which set quotas for individual whale species.
