= Cape Roca (Antarctica) =

Cape on Laurie Island

- Interactive map of Cape Roca

Cape Roca (60°45′S 44°49′W) is a cape, 2 nautical miles (3.7 km) northwest of Cape Davidson at the west end of Laurie Island, in the South Orkney Islands. Charted in 1903 by the Scottish National Antarctic Expedition under Bruce, who named it for Julio A. Roca, President of Argentina, 1880–86 and 1898–1904.
