= International Whaling Commission =

International body regulating whaling

- Formation: 2 December 1946; 79 years ago
- Type: Specialised regional fishery management organization
- Legal status: International organization
- Purpose: "provide for the proper conservation of whale stocks and thus make possible the orderly development of the whaling industry"
- Headquarters: Impington, United Kingdom
- Members: 89 countries (2026)
- Executive Secretary: Ms. Martha Rojas Urrego (2023– )
- Website: iwc.int/home

The International Whaling Commission (IWC) is a specialised regional fishery management organisation, established under the terms of the 1946 International Convention for the Regulation of Whaling (ICRW) to "provide for the proper conservation of whale stocks and thus make possible the orderly development of the whaling industry".

As the decision-making body of the convention, the IWC reviews and revises measures laid down in the "Schedule to the Convention", which govern the conduct of whaling throughout the world. These measures include: confer complete protection of certain species; designate specific areas as whale sanctuaries; set limits on the numbers and size of whales which may be taken; prescribe open and closed seasons and areas for whaling; and prohibit the capture of suckling calves and female whales accompanied by calves. The Commission also mandates the compilation of catch reports and other statistical and biological records, and is actively involved in whale research, including funding and promoting studies, publishing the results of scientific research, and encouraging studies into related matters, such as the humaneness of the killing operations.

Through the "Florianópolis Declaration" of 2018, members of the organization concluded that the purpose of the IWC is the conservation of whales and that they would now safeguard the marine mammals in perpetuity and would allow the recovery of all whale populations to pre-industrial whaling levels. In response, Japan announced on 26 December 2018, that since the IWC failed its duty to promote sustainable hunting, which is one of its stated goals, Japan is withdrawing its membership and will resume commercial hunting in its territorial waters and exclusive economic zone from July 2019, but will cease whaling activities in the Southern Hemisphere.

== History and formation ==
The IWC was created by voluntary agreement among the member states to function as the sole governing body with authority to act under the International Convention for the Regulation of Whaling, which is an international environmental agreement signed in 1946 in order to "provide for the proper conservation of whale stocks and thus make possible the orderly development of the whaling industry" and to implement its economic and environmental goals. The development of cannon-fired harpoons, steam-powered whaling vessels, and harpoons with explosive tips in the 19th century allowed for the large-scale commercial exploitation of whales, including faster-swimming species like blue whales (Balaenoptera musculus) and fin whales (B. physalus). In the early 20th century whalers were operating largely in the Antarctic Ocean from shore stations and moored factory vessels; in 1913 the total catch was 10,760. The stern slipway, which allowed whaling vessels to operate far from land, was invented in 1925, and by 1931 the annual world catch had risen to a record 43,000 whales.

Recognising the rapidly increasing harvest of whales, the League of Nations in 1927 proposed international regulation, but this was opposed by several whaling nations. In 1931 twenty one countries signed the Convention for the Regulation of Whaling in Geneva, to come into effect in 1935, though this was not enforceable and was ignored by established whaling nations. Overproduction led to a glut in the production of whale oil and falling world prices. The whaling companies themselves tried to limit the catch by forming a cartel in 1932 and adopting a quota, measured in Blue Whale Units. This was the first effective limitation of whale catches, and temporarily reduced harvests for two years without, however, restoring the price of whale oil. The International Agreement for the Regulation of Whaling was signed in London on 8 June 1937; the whaling community agreed to shorten the harvesting season and to ban the catch of bowhead (Balaena mysticetus), gray (Eschrichtius robustus) and right whales—species that had been hunted nearly to extinction—and set a minimum harvestable size for other whales. The consequence, though, was that whaling ships worked faster, to catch as many whales as possible in the shorter season.

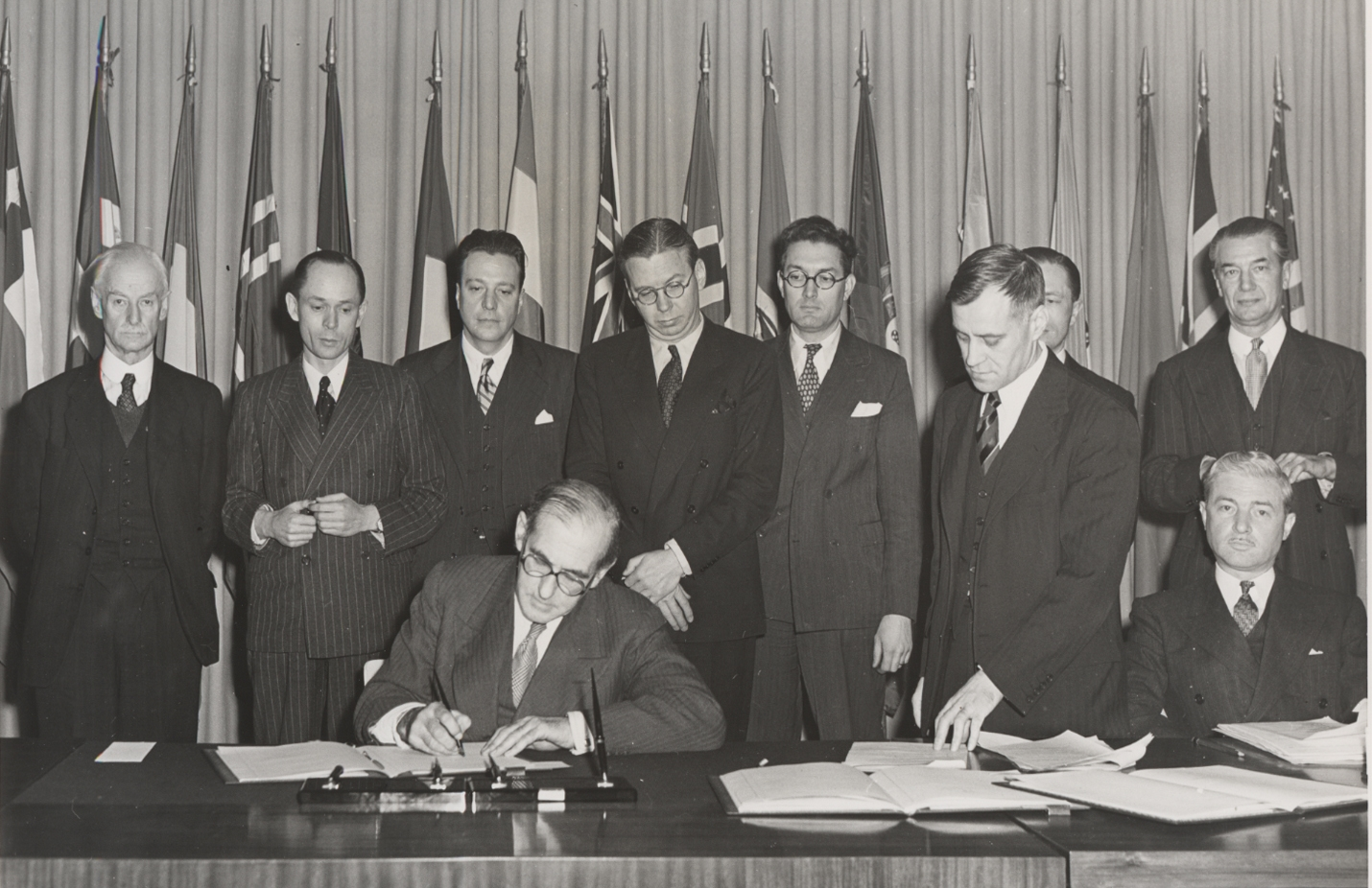
The signing of the International Convention for the Regulation of Whaling in Washington D.C. on 2 December 1946

World War II caused a temporary contraction in whaling, but also led to a world shortage of animal fats and increased pressure to harvest whales. A protocol signed by seven nations in London in February 1944 reaffirmed the pre-war agreements, and proposed a limit on total whale catch measured in Blue Whale Units. After the war many more nations began harvesting whales, and it was clear that rather than a series of conferences (which demanded lengthy negotiations and ratification processes from each affected nation), a permanent body to regulate whaling was needed. Using the mechanisms for negotiating international agreements that had been developed in the 1930s, the USA organised a conference of major whaling nations in Washington D.C. in 1946. These led to the International Convention for the Regulation of Whaling, which was signed by representatives of 15 major whaling nations on 20 November 1946 and came into effect in 1948.

== Structure and membership ==
Member states of the International Whaling Commission (in blue)

The role of the commission is to periodically review and revise the Schedule to the Convention, controlling the conduct of whaling by setting the protection of certain species; designating areas as whale sanctuaries; setting limits on the numbers and size of catches; prescribing open and closed seasons and areas for whaling; methods and intensity of whaling, types of gear to be used, methods of measurement and maximum catch returns. Under its constitutive document, the IWC is given the task of adopting regulations "to provide for the conservation, development, and optimum utilization of the whale resources" with the condition that such regulations "shall be based on scientific findings."

The headquarters of the IWC is in Impington, near Cambridge, England. The Secretariat publishes the Journal of Cetacean Research and Management, reports, press releases, and a calendar of meetings. The commission has three main committees—Scientific, Conservation, and Finance and Administration. A Technical Committee is established, but has stopped meeting.

Participation in the IWC is not limited to states involved in whaling. Membership in the IWC has doubled since 2001 with an average of almost six states per year joining the IWC from 2002 to 2008. As of September there were 89 members: Antigua and Barbuda, Argentina, Australia, Austria, Belgium, Belize, Benin, Brazil, Bulgaria, Cambodia, Cameroon, Chile, China, Colombia, Republic of the Congo, Costa Rica, Ivory Coast, Croatia, Cyprus, Czech Republic, Denmark (which also acts as the Kingdom with the Faroe Islands and Greenland), Dominica, Dominican Republic, Ecuador, Eritrea, Estonia, Finland, France, Gabon, the Gambia, Germany, Ghana, Grenada, Republic of Guinea, Guinea-Bissau, Hungary, Iceland, India, Ireland, Israel, Italy, Kenya, Kiribati, South Korea, Laos, Liberia, Lithuania, Luxembourg, Mali, Republic of the Marshall Islands, Mauritania, Mexico, Monaco, Mongolia, Morocco, Naoeru, Netherlands, New Zealand, Nicaragua, Norway, Oman, Palau, Panama, Peru, Poland, Portugal, Romania, Russia, Saint Kitts and Nevis, Saint Lucia, Saint Vincent and the Grenadines, San Marino, São Tomé and Príncipe, Senegal, Slovakia, Slovenia, Solomon Islands, South Africa, Spain, Suriname, Sweden, Switzerland, Tanzania, Togo, Türkiye, Tuvalu, United Kingdom, United States, and Uruguay.

Five Executive Secretaries of the IWC: (left to right) Martha Rojas Urrego, Rebecca Lent, Simon Brockington, Nicky Grandy, and Ray Gambell

Since 2012 the IWC has met in even-numbered years, in September or October. Meetings are composed of one voting representative (called a Commissioner) from each state party who may be accompanied by experts and advisors. They are generally extremely divisive—demonstrating a complete split on all major issues between the pro-whaling governments and their supporters and the anti-whaling countries. The IWC's Rules of Procedure allow non-parties and intergovernmental organisations to attend the meetings and to be represented by observers if they have submitted a written request to the Secretary thirty days before the meeting or if they have attended previous meetings. Non-governmental organisations that maintain offices in more than three countries may also attend the meetings of the IWC.

In 2012, the Commission agreed to move from annual to biennial Commission Meetings. The Scientific Committee continues to meet annually. In years where both meetings are held, a period of at least 100 days separates the two. This is to allow time to read and digest the reports of the Scientific Committee Meeting, before the Commission Meeting begins.

== Annual meetings ==
Members of the International Whaling Commission have met every year since 1949, in addition to having occasional intersessional 'special meetings' (these are not 'annual meetings').

In recent years, the meetings have attracted international media attention due to the growth of the anti-whaling movement.

65th meeting of the IWC, Portorož, Slovenia, in 2014

Year	Host city, country
1969	London, United Kingdom
1970	London, United Kingdom
1971	Washington, D.C., United States
1972	London, United Kingdom
1973	London, United Kingdom
1974	London, United Kingdom
1975	London, United Kingdom
1976	London, United Kingdom
1977	Canberra, Australia
1978	Cambridge, United Kingdom
1979	Cambridge, United Kingdom
1980	Cambridge, United Kingdom
1981	Cambridge, United Kingdom
1982	Brighton, United Kingdom
1983	Brighton, United Kingdom
1984	Eastbourne, United Kingdom
1985	Bournemouth, United Kingdom
1986	Malmö, Sweden
1987	Bournemouth, United Kingdom
1988	San Diego, United States
1989	San Diego, United States
1990	Noordwijkerhout, Netherlands
1991	Reykjavík, Iceland
1992	Glasgow, United Kingdom
1993	Kyoto, Japan
1994	Puerto Vallarta, Mexico
1995	Dublin, Ireland
1996	Aberdeen, United Kingdom
1997	Bournemouth, United Kingdom
1998	Muscat, Oman
1999	St. George's, Grenada

66th meeting of the International Whaling Commission in Portorož, Slovenia, in 2016

Martha Rojas Urrego (IWC Executive Secretary) opens the 70th IWC meeting in Hobart, Australia, in 2026

International Whaling Commission annual meetings since 2000
Year	Dates	Host	City	Reference
2000	3–6 July	Australia	Adelaide	
2001	23–27 July	United Kingdom	London	
2002	20–24 May	Japan	Shimonoseki	
2003	16–20 June	Germany	Berlin	
2004	19–22 July	Italy	Sorrento	
2005	20–24 June	South Korea	Ulsan	
2006	16–20 June	Saint Kitts and Nevis	Frigate Bay	
2007	28–31 May	United States	Anchorage	
2008	23–27 June	Chile	Santiago	
2009	22–26 June	Portugal	Funchal (Madeira)	
2010	21–25 June	Morocco	Agadir	
2011	11–14 June	Jersey	St Helier	
2012	2–6 July	Panama	Panama City	
2014	15–18 September	Slovenia	Portorož	
2016	20–28 October	Slovenia	Portorož	
2018	4–14 September	Brazil	Florianópolis	
2020	Cancelled due to COVID-19 pandemic			
2022	13–21 October	Slovenia	Portorož	
2024	23–27 September	Peru	Lima	
2026	27 September – 2 October	Australia	Hobart	

The IWC also holds occasional "special meetings" (there were five between 1949 and 2007).

From 2012 onwards, it was decided that the annual Commission Meetings would go to biennial Commission Meetings, while the IWC Scientific Committee would still meet annually.

=== IWC meeting in 2005 ===
Flag of South Korea

The International Whaling Commission meeting in 2005 was held in Ulsan, South Korea from 20–24 June 2005. This meeting saw discussion and vote upon several particularly divisive matters. Notable among them were three defeated Japanese proposals:

- A proposal to have secret ballot voting. Many watchers of the Commission interpreted this proposal as designed to allow Japan's protégé member states to vote in a way that was less transparent.
- A proposal to re-institute commercial whaling, which would have required a three quarters majority to carry the vote, was defeated 29 votes to 23 against.
- A proposal to remove a decade old Southern Ocean whale sanctuary, which was defeated 30 votes against 25.

Responding to Japan's stated intentions of increasing their scientific whaling quota, Australia also introduced a non-binding resolution that calls on Japan to halt the expansion of its scientific whaling program, which was supported by 30 votes to 25. Opponents of scientific whaling claim it is commercial whaling under a different name. New Zealand's Minister of Conservation, Chris Carter, said, "We find (the) whole use of the phrase 'scientific whaling' an outrage." Japan, however, claims that their research activities contribute to scientific knowledge of the management of whales. In the face of these setbacks, Japan has not ruled out withdrawing from the IWC, but this would require approval by the Japanese parliament.

=== IWC meeting in 2006 ===
Flag of Saint Kitts and Nevis

The International Whaling Commission meeting in 2006 was held 16 June–20 June in St Kitts and Nevis. Pro whaling countries unsuccessfully challenged the 1982 moratorium, yet succeeded in shifting the IWC focus from whale conservation to management of commercial whaling.

Of the two votes proposed by Japan on the first day, both were defeated by narrow majorities. 30–32 in the case of removing small cetaceans from IWC competence and 30–33 on the proposal to introduce secret ballots. A number of countries, including Costa Rica, Gambia, Peru, and Togo were not present at the vote or had not completed their registration procedures/fees payments before the votes.

Greenland voluntarily introduced a reduction in fin whales taken following advice from the IWC Scientific committee (IWC SC) that the catch of 19 animals may not be a safe level of catch and noted that this left Greenland with a shortfall of 220 tons of whale meat from their quota of 670 tons. They made enquiries into the stock levels of Humpback whales and Bowhead whales around Greenland, with the possible intent of opening up a hunt eventually on these two species to make up the shortfall. This of course alarmed anti-whaling countries and NGO's immediately.

The RMS was discussed yet again in depth to no avail, with the chairman of the IWC, Henrik Fischer, noting that RMS discussions are at an impasse and that he will close discussion on the RMS on the afternoon of 18 June if nobody comes up with any new ideas.

Japan proposed a schedule amendment regarding its coastal whaling communities to take a small number of Minke whales From the "O" Stock. After much discussion, the proposal was defeated with 30 votes for the proposal and 31 votes against with 4 abstentions.

Discussion of the southern ocean sanctuary continued, as well as a Caribbean sanctuary proposed by France. The vote on whether to remove the southern ocean sanctuary was defeated by 28–33 with 5 abstentions. The French delegate was verbally denounced by a number of Caribbean nations for not discussing their proposed sanctuary with any of the other Caribbean nations in advance of their proposal and the proposal was not voted upon. The St Kitts and Nevis Declaration was discussed and voted upon, and adopted with 33 votes in favour, 32 against, and one abstention, the first time in more than two decades that the Whaling Commission has expressed support for commercial whaling. The Declaration declared the moratorium on whaling "no longer necessary".

== 1982 moratorium ==
The 1970s saw the beginning of the global anti-whaling movement. In 1972 the United Nations Conference on the Human Environment at Stockholm adopted a proposal that recommended a ten-year moratorium on commercial whaling to allow whale stocks to recover. The reports of the Convention on International Trade in Endangered Species in 1977 and 1981 identified many species of whales as being in danger of extinction.

At the same time, a number of non-whaling and anti-whaling states began to join the IWC and eventually gained a majority over the whaling states. Some countries who were previously major whaling forces, like the United States, became strong proponents of the anti-whaling cause. These countries called for the IWC to reform its policies and to incorporate newly discovered scientific data regarding whales in its proposed regulations.

On 23 July 1982, members of the IWC voted by the necessary three-quarters majority to implement a pause on commercial whaling. The relevant text reads:

Notwithstanding the other provisions of paragraph 10, catch limits for the killing for commercial purposes of whales from all stocks for the 1986 coastal and the 1985/86 pelagic seasons and thereafter shall be zero. This provision will be kept under review, based upon the best scientific advice, and by 1990 at the latest the Commission will undertake a comprehensive assessment of the effects of this decision on whale stocks and consider modification of this provision and the establishment of other catch limits.

The measure passed by 25 votes to seven, with five abstentions.

Japan, Norway, Peru, and the Soviet Union (later replaced by Russia) lodged formal objections, since the moratorium was not based on advice from the Scientific Committee. Japan and Peru later withdrew their objections (Japan's withdrawal was precipitated by the US threatening to reduce their fishing quota within US waters if the objection was not withdrawn. However, by 1988 the US had eliminated Japanese fishing quotas anyway. It was after this that the Japanese began scientific whaling.). In 2002, Iceland was allowed to rejoin IWC with a reservation to the moratorium (Iceland withdrew from IWC in 1992), but this reservation is not recognised as a valid objection by many IWC members. In addition, Italy, Mexico, and New Zealand do not consider the ICRW to be in force between their countries and Iceland. None of these countries, however, has mounted any legal challenge to Iceland's membership of the IWC.

As the moratorium applies only to commercial whaling, whaling under the scientific-research and aboriginal-subsistence provisions of the ICRW is still allowed. However, environmental groups dispute the claim of research "as a disguise for commercial whaling, which is banned." Since 1994, Norway has been whaling commercially and Iceland began hunting commercially in September 2006. Since 1986, Japan has been whaling under scientific research permits. The US and several other countries are whaling under aboriginal whaling auspices. Norway lodged a protest to the zero catch limits in 1992 and is not bound by them. Anti-whaling countries and lobbies accuse Japan's scientific whaling of being a front for commercial whaling. The Japanese government argues that the refusal of anti-whaling states to accept simple head counts of whale population as a measure of recovery of whale species justifies its continuing studies on sex and age of population distributions, and further points out that IWC regulations specifically require that whale meat obtained by scientific whaling not go to waste. Japan, on the other hand, has raised objections to U.S. aboriginal subsistence whaling, generally seen to be in retaliation to anti-whaling states' (including the United States') objections to aboriginal subsistence whaling for several Japanese fishing communities, which traditionally hunted whales until the imposition of the moratorium.

In May 1994, the IWC also voted to create the 11,800,000-square-mile (31,000,000 km^{2}) Southern Ocean Whale Sanctuary. The vote to adopt the sanctuary resolution was twenty-three in favour, one opposed (Japan) and six abstaining.

== 2018 Florianópolis Declaration ==
On 13 September 2018, IWC members gathered in Florianópolis, Brazil, where they discussed and rejected a proposal by Japan to renew commercial whaling. Through the "Florianópolis Declaration", it was concluded that the purpose of the IWC is the conservation of whales and that they would now safeguard the marine mammals in perpetuity and would allow the recovery of all whale populations to pre-industrial whaling levels. It also concluded that the use of lethal research methods is unnecessary. The non-binding agreement was backed by 40 countries, with 27 pro-whaling states voting against. Under this resolution, limited hunts by some indigenous communities are still permitted.

On 26 December 2018, Japan announced that since the IWC failed its duty to promote sustainable hunting, which is one of its stated goals, Japan was withdrawing its membership. Japanese officials also announced they would resume commercial hunting within its territorial waters and its 200-mile exclusive economic zones starting in July 2019, but it would cease whaling activities in the Antarctic Ocean, the northwest Pacific Ocean, and the Australian Whale Sanctuary.

== The IWC today ==
Since the departure of Japan in 2019, only two of the 89 countries that are members of the IWC still conduct commercial whaling: Iceland and Norway. Iceland made reservations to the moratorium when they re-ratified the ICRW, so their whale industry is both legal and not regulated by the IWC. Norway did not leave but exercised its right to object to the moratorium. The IWC's responsibilities have consequently shifted in recent years from the management of whale stocks for the development of the whaling industry to the conservation of whales in general. This takes many forms, including the preservation of dolphins and other small cetaceans, the establishment of whale sanctuaries, and the creation of regulations or recommendations to prevent other threats to cetaceans. The scope of the IWC has been questioned by some members, but the ICRW allows it to make binding recommendations to implement the Convention's objectives, and non-binding recommendations "on any matters which relate to whales or whaling and to the objectives and purposes of the Convention."

Some IWC member states have debated the Commission's mandate to manage small cetaceans, to pursue conservation initiatives that are not directly linked to supporting the whaling industry, and to manage stocks within a nation's territorial waters. However the language of the 1946 ICRW is imprecise as to the exact species it covers, simply naming them as "whales", and species such as pilot whales, orca, and dolphins are all classified in the Odontoceti or toothed whales. While in 1946 whaling was concerned with the largest cetaceans, in recent years the recognition of "whale stocks" seen as valuable can extend to smaller species, in for example commercial whale watching. Consequently IWC's Conservation Committee has developed management plans for a number of threatened small cetacean species, and arguably the IWC is the best-placed organisation to lead conservation efforts for these populations.

The preamble of the ICRW states the conservation of whale stocks is intended to "make possible the orderly development of a whaling industry," so some legal scholars have argued it may only support conservation measures that benefit whaling. Another reading of the ICRW gives the IWC some discretion to interpret its mandate. Other sections make it clear the purpose of the ICRW is "to protect all species of whales from further over-fishing" and "safeguarding for future generations the great natural resources represented by whale stocks", suggesting whale conservation is an end in itself and the whaling industry a beneficiary of this.

The ICRW also gives its geographic scope as "all waters in which whaling is prosecuted", not just international waters, and this is not superseded by the 1994 Law of the Sea Treaty, which requires states to cooperate with international organizations such as the IWC. As part of its mandate the IWC is empowered to create whale sanctuaries, which it first did for baleen whales in the Southern Ocean in 1946, although this was suspended in 1955. The Indian Ocean Whale Sanctuary was created in 1979, and the Southern Ocean Whale Sanctuary in 1994. Subsequent attempts to create a South Atlantic Whale Sanctuary and a South Pacific Whale Sanctuary failed to secure the necessary three quarters majority of IWC members.

Whale disentanglement training at Monterey Bay National Marine Sanctuary

Whale sanctuaries created under the ICRW prohibit whaling, but the main threats to whales today are not commercial whaling but marine pollution (including underwater noise), climate change, being struck by ships, fisheries bycatch, and entanglement in fishing gear (the latter two kill at least 300,000 cetaceans a year). The IWC has developed non-binding recommendations and guidelines on many of these issues, such as whale strandings (setting up an IWC Strandings Initiative in 2016), a Vessel Strikes Database, and a Bycatch Mitigation Initiative.

The ICRW allows the IWC to "organize studies and investigations relating to whales and whaling", collect statistics on the effect of whaling activities, and study means of increasing whale stocks. To this end it carries out and supports scientific research on whales, for example monitoring the whale stocks in the Southern Ocean each year since 1978, and launching the Journal of Cetacean Research and Management in 1999.

Alaska Eskimo Whaling Commission at the 70th IWC meeting

One part of the IWC's mandate from its establishment has been the management of the traditional subsistence whaling of indigenous people, known as Aboriginal Subsistence Whaling (ASW). The IWC Scientific Committee works with hunting communities to develop sustainable catch plans, negotiating a compromise between the needs of the community, the safety of hunters, and the welfare of the whales.

Article V(2) of the ICRW requires the IWC to take into account the interests of the consumers of whale products and the whaling industry. This mandate extends to whether whale meat contains pollutants, whether it is correctly labelled, and whether the animal was humanely killed. For decades the IWC has regulated whale killing methods to minimise the suffering of the animals, such as banning the cold (non-explosive) harpoon in 1980; Article V(1) permits it to regulate the types of killing devices used in whaling. It has called for humane killing methods to reduce "cruelty and inhumanity" in aboriginal whaling and encouraged its members to choose non-lethal methods of scientific research on whales.

Whale watching in Kaikōura, New Zealand

The IWC collects data on levels of contaminants in whales. Marine pollution not only affects the health and status of whale populations, but contaminants can harm consumers of whale meat—commercial whale meat shipments from Norway have contained dangerous levels of mercury, dieldrin, and chlordane. If whales from a particular area are determined to be highly contaminated, the IWC has authority to close the area to whaling; it encourages its members to report on possible effects on human health of whale meat consumption and to reduce marine pollution. As part of mechanisms to prevent an illegal trade in whale meat, the IWC can issue binding regulations requiring monitoring and inspection, including DNA testing, of the meat.

The "whaling industry" can also be interpreted to mean the commercial whale watching industry, which can be highly lucrative for some coastal areas, and far exceed any revenue from hunting whales. In 2019, whale watching in Alaska generated $103 million in economic output and supported 850 jobs. The IWC Scientific Committee developed principles and guidelines for whale watching in 1996, updated in 2022, implemented its first five-year Strategic Plan for Whale Watching in 2011, and has produced a Whale Watching Handbook with guidelines for the industry and consumers.

== Enforcement under the IWC ==
IWC is a voluntary international organization and is not backed up by treaty, therefore, the IWC has substantial practical limitations on its authority. First, any member countries are free to simply leave the organization and declare themselves not bound by it if they so wish. Second, any member state may opt out of any specific IWC regulation by lodging a formal objection to it within 90 days of the regulation coming into force (such provisions are common in international agreements, on the logic that it is preferable to have parties remain within the agreements than opt out altogether). Third, the IWC has no ability to enforce any of its decisions through penalty imposition.

=== International Observer Scheme ===
In 1971, Australia and South Africa agreed to supply observers to each other (International Observer Scheme, IOS) to ensure their land-based whaling stations were in compliance of the IWC. A similar agreement was drawn up between Canada, Iceland and Norway covering the North Atlantic area. This was shortly followed by an agreement between Japan and the United States in the North Pacific Ocean. The introduction of the IOS had a positive effect on quality of the reported catch data, according to the Royal Society, despite no significant change in regulations, indicating false reporting may have been prevalent in the Japanese whaling industry prior to the IOS.

== Politics ==
There has been concern that the conflict between those who seek renewed utilisation of whales and those who seek protection for every whale has placed a dangerous strain on the IWC. Oran Young and eight other noted scholars in the field assert that "changes in the current [IWC] arrangements are inevitable" and that "the killing of whales for human consumption will continue, whether whalers operate within a reconstructed international whaling regime, opt to join alternative arrangements like NAMMCO, or seek to establish a hybrid system". The BBC also reports that "[c]onservationists argue that the IWC should be devoting far more of its attention to issues such as whales being hit by ships, the effects of pollution and climate change, and the pressures that drive species such as the baiji (or Yangtse river dolphin) to extinction. As things stand, it cannot. The logjam of hunting has to be overcome first."

=== Allegation of politicising science ===
The pro-whaling governments accuse the IWC of basing these decisions upon "political and emotional" factors rather than upon scientific knowledge given that the IWC prohibits all whaling, even though its own Scientific Committee has concluded since 1991 that quotas on some species of whale would be sustainable. They argue the IWC has swayed from its original purpose and is attempting, under the guise of conservation, to essentially grant whales an entitlement to life via an absolute protection from being killed by humans for commercial purposes.

Non-IWC whaling countries have expressed similar sentiments. Canada withdrew from the IWC after the vote to impose the moratorium, claiming that "[t]he ban was inconsistent with measures that had just been adopted by the IWC that were designed to allow harvests of stocks at safe levels."

After the moratorium came into force in 1986, the Scientific Committee was commissioned to review the status of the whale stocks and develop a calculation method for setting safe catch limits. At the IWC's annual meeting in 1991, the Scientific Committee submitted its finding that there existed approximately 761,000 minke whales in Antarctic waters, 87,000 in the northeast Atlantic, and 25,000 in the North Pacific. With such populations, it was submitted, 2000 minke whales could be harvested annually without endangering the population. Despite this, the IWC Plenary Committee voted to maintain the blanket moratorium on whaling, arguing that formulas for determining allowable catches had not yet been adequately evaluated.

In 1991, acting on the recommendation of the Scientific Committee, the IWC adopted a computerized formula, the Revised Management Procedure (RMP), for determining allowable catches of some whale species. Despite the fact that the RMP indicated that it would be possible to authorize a catch that year, the moratorium was not lifted. The IWC noted the need to agree on minimum standards for data, to prepare guidelines on the conduct of population surveys, and to devise and approve a system of measures for monitoring and inspection.

The IWC Plenary committee adopted the RMP in 1994, but decided not to implement it before an inspection and control scheme had been developed. This scheme, together with the RMP, is known as the Revised Management Scheme (RMS). Since then it has been all but impossible for the member countries in the Plenary committee to agree on an RMS.

Australia is the only member country of IWC which has officially announced its opposition to any RMS and is therefore not participating in the discussions. Anti-whaling NGOs, such as Sea Shepherd and Greenpeace, are also generally against the RMS.

Ray Gambell, then the Secretary of the IWC, agreed at least in part with the argument of the pro-whaling countries: "In all reasonableness, we would have to say that a commercial catch could be taken without endangering [Minke] stocks." In June 1993 the Chairman of the Scientific Committee, Dr Philip Hammond, resigned in protest to what he saw as contempt of the Scientific Committee's recommendations. The same year Norway became the only state in the world to resume commercial whaling, on the grounds that they had objected to, and thus opted out, of the moratorium.

=== IWC membership ===
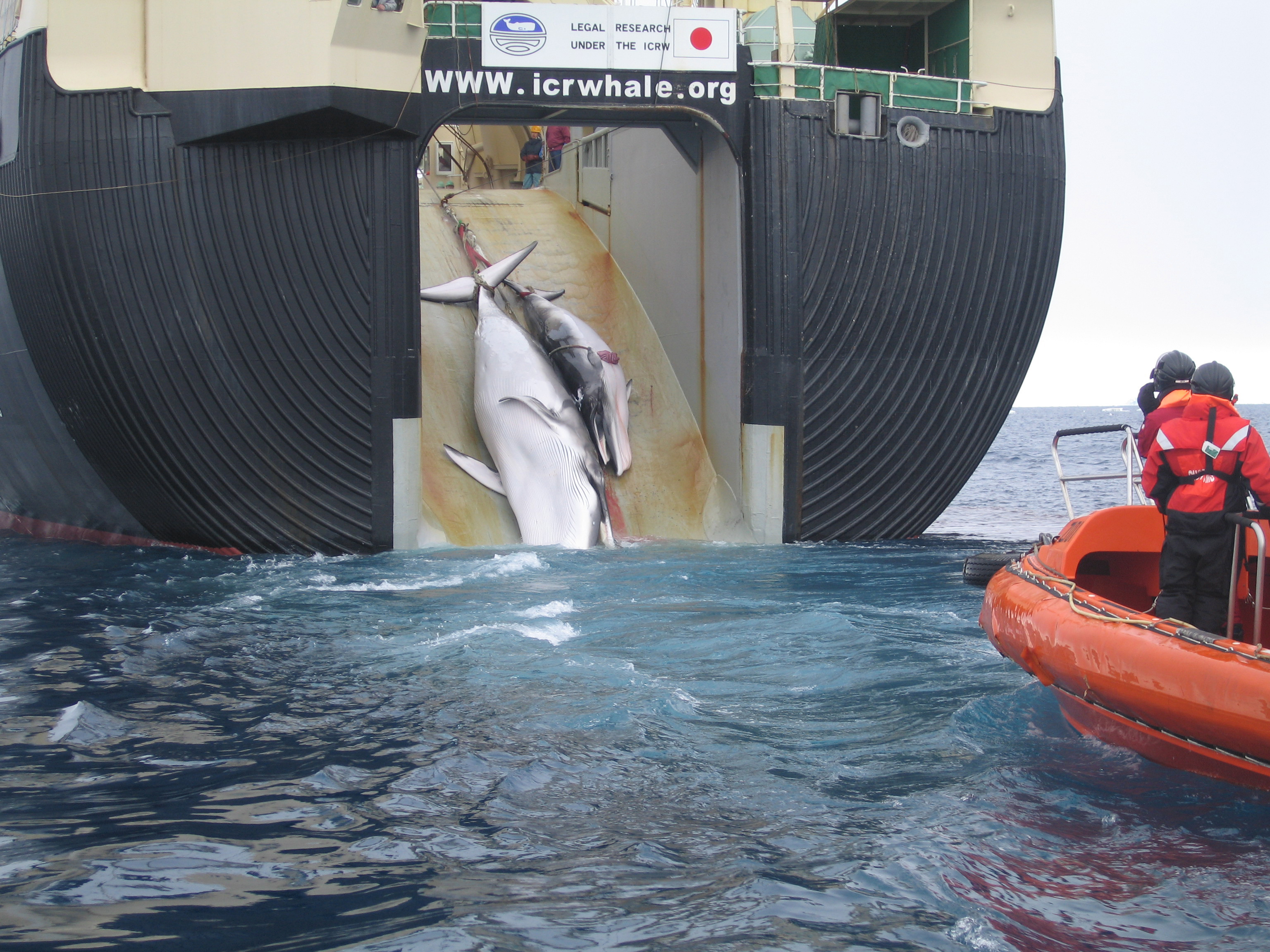
An adult and sub-adult Minke whale are dragged aboard the Nisshin Maru, a Japanese whaling vessel.

The purpose of the IWC as specified in its constitution is "in safeguarding for future generations the great natural resources represented by the whale stocks;" and the original members consisted only of the 15 whale-hunting countries. However, since the late 1970s and early 1980s, many countries which have no previous history of whaling (some of which are landlocked such as Switzerland and Mongolia) have joined the IWC. This shift was first initiated by Sir Peter Scott, the then head of the World Wildlife Fund. Labelling the IWC a "butchers' club", he mounted lobbying campaigns in developed countries with support from the green lobby and anti-whaling block of IWC members to change the composition of the IWC's membership, which was instrumental in obtaining the necessary three-quarters majority vote to implement the moratorium on commercial whaling in 1986. This campaign triggered the first accusations of vote-buying in IWC. According to Scott's biographer, Elspeth Huxley, China's decision to join was influenced by a World Wildlife Fund promise to provide $1 million to fund a panda reserve. Michael Tillman, former IWC Commissioner of the United States, said in a radio interview that "there was what we called 'common knowledge,' that a number of countries joined and that their dues and the travel support was reportedly due to conservation groups providing it. So that, in a sense, one could say that the conservation groups set out a strategy that the Japanese copied."

Since the moratorium was adopted, the support for it has dropped from a 75% majority to a 50–50 split, with many of the countries initially recruited by the anti-whaling side now voting with the pro-whaling block. (A 75% majority is needed to overturn the moratorium.) Anti-whaling campaign groups and some governments claim that the Japanese Fisheries Agency has carried out a programme of "vote-buying"—i.e. offering aid to poorer countries in return for them joining the IWC and supporting Japanese positions on whaling. Japan claims, however, that this accusation itself is politically motivated because Japan's overseas aid is not only given to pro-whaling countries. Japan has given US$320 million in overseas aid to Antigua and Barbuda, Dominica, Grenada, Guinea, Morocco, Panama, St. Lucia, Saint Vincent and the Grenadines, St Kitts and Nevis and the Solomon Islands. Caribbean countries have consistently sided with Japan in each IWC vote since 2001 though the Caribbean governments admit the rules may possibly impact on their fishing activities as well. Pacific countries' voting patterns vary even for each motion, as they are lobbied by neighbouring pro-whaling Japan and anti-whaling New Zealand and Australia. Greenpeace alleges that Japan's aid activities and these countries' voting patterns are correlated. These allegations of tying aid to votes are based on public admissions by government officials both inside and outside Japan, as well as an analysis of voting patterns compared to Japanese Fisheries Aid received. In 2005, The Environmental Investigation Agency approached Lord Ashcroft of the UK to use his influence in Belize to assure support for the anti-whaling camp. It was reported that Ashcroft paid Belize's IWC subscription fees:

"Every month I'm on the water somewhere," he says. "I've grown a close affinity, not just for whales, but for dolphins and porpoises. So it wasn't difficult for me to approach the Belizean authorities with such a brief." He discovered that Belize's annual subscription to the IWC—£10,000—had lapsed and came up with the cash. That backing yielded swift results when a crucial vote was won by the anti-whaling nations by a majority of one.

Both sides accuse each other of using underhanded tactics to pack the commission with countries sympathetic to their position. Edwin Snagg, the IWC commissioner for St Vincent and the Grenadines stated, "It's a question of respect,....Because you are small and because you are underdeveloped there is this view and there is this feeling that you can easily be bought and you can easily be sold. We in the Caribbean feel highly offended." Moreover, there are no developing countries who support an anti-whaling stance. The BBC reported that "Some countries recently admitted to the European Union have been advised by a "word in the ear" that it would be "a good idea" for them to join the IWC. Some activists believe that Britain and its fellow EU old-timers such as France and Germany should recruit all member states into the commission." In Australia, National Nine News reported that "New Zealand is questioning pro-whaling support among Pacific Island states with the opposition calling for a rethink of foreign aid." It is expected that more countries in the future will join the IWC including some landlocked countries. Currently, there are nine landlocked IWC members. Mali and Mongolia voted with other pro-whaling countries. Austria, the Czech Republic, Hungary, Luxembourg, Slovakia, Switzerland and San Marino voted with other anti-whaling countries.

Both pro- and anti-whaling countries claim that their recruiting activities are restricted to lobbying and persuasion based on the merits of their cause. Anti-whaling campaigners argue that scientific studies are not currently clear enough to warrant resumption of commercial whaling. Moreover, there are various other issues such as welfare of whales which is beyond the simple matter of conservation. (See The arguments for and against whaling) These issues have global relevance which is not restricted only to whaling and whaling countries. Moreover, public opinion in many anti-whaling countries is solidly behind the governmental position on whaling within the IWC. Pro-whaling countries, on the other hand, argue that the public's anti-whaling stance is often based on misinformation – a 2003 article in The Economist noted that surveys in Australia, the United Kingdom, and the United States had found that a majority of respondents incorrectly believe that all whale species are endangered.

Moreover, coastal countries have a vested interest in conserving their fish stocks which may be threatened by whales (this claim is strongly contested by the anti-whaling lobby). Japan, particularly when lobbying African governments, argues that diversification of the anti-whaling argument outside of conservation is a threat to their national interest. Exploitation of wildlife resources (such as elephant ivory, sea turtles or primates) is restricted supposedly on the ground of sustainable management. Alleged filibustering of the Revised Management Scheme and diversification of arguments outside of conservation by the anti-whaling side are claimed to be signs that anti-whaling countries no longer adhere to this principle (of sustainable management and exploitation of natural resources). The Japanese argue that the African countries and whaling countries have a shared interest in preventing the principle of sustainable management being exploited as a cover for animal rights arguments:

Owing to the economic power of the US and the UK, CITES was forced to list perfectly healthy species of whales (over the objections of its secretariat), along with legitimately endangered species, on its banned list. This has severely eroded CITES' credibility, especially in the world's developing countries, where hundreds of animal species are mortally endangered.

At the London IWC meeting in 2001 Sandra Lee-Vercoe, the New Zealand delegate to the commission, accused Japan of buying votes. The Japanese delegate denied the allegations:

Japan gives foreign aid to more than 150 nations around the world and that includes strong anti-whaling nations such as Chile, Argentina, Brazil, Mexico and others who receive far more aid than the Caribbean nations [...] If Japan was buying votes, you would see 150 nations in the IWC and as a consequence the unnecessary moratorium would have been lifted years ago.

— Masayuki Komatsu

Komatsu also said that Caribbean countries naturally supported pro-whaling resolutions as they are whaling countries themselves (mostly of smaller cetaceans) and that the New Zealand commissioner was inventing "fairy stories".

Anti-whaling groups cite several statements in response to this rebuttal. In an interview reported in The Observer newspaper in May 2001, Atherton Martin, Dominica's former Environment and Fisheries Minister who publicly opposes whaling, said:

They [Japan] make it clear, that if you don't vote for them, they will have to reconsider the aid. They use money crudely to buy influence.

— Atherton Martin

Greenpeace also quotes Tongan parliamentarian Samiu K Vaipulu as saying at a workshop on the proposed South Pacific Whale Sanctuary in Samoa that Japan had linked whale votes to aid. Lester Bird, prime minister of Antigua and Barbuda, had said:

So as long as the whales are not an endangered species, I don't see any reason why if we are able to support the Japanese and the quid pro quo is that they will give us some assistance. I'm not going to be a hypocrite.

— Lester Bird

Japanese whaling since 1985. The catch in 1985, 1986, and about half of 1987 were "under objection"; the rest are "scientific permit".

In an interview with Australian ABC television in July 2001, Japanese Fisheries Agency official Maseyuku Komatsu described minke whales as "cockroaches of the sea". The Sydney Morning Herald reported that he further stated "lacking military might, his country had to use the tools of diplomacy and promises of development aid to "get appreciation of Japan's position" on whaling. Billions of yen have flowed to countries that joined the IWC from both pro- and anti-whaling countries. "It already brings back the time when we were colonised," says Clarice Charles, of Grenada. "Would these rich nations give a poor fisherman a revolving loan or a grant or a gift so that he can buy [a tourist boat] to go whale watching?"

In Japan, conservative media outlets (the most vocal ones being Sankei Shimbun and Bungei Shunju) argue that countries which oppose commercial whaling altogether should not be in the IWC at all and that the anti-whaling side has subverted the purpose of the IWC by exploiting the (lack of) membership requirements. Moreover, they point out that the anti-whaling lobby within the IWC is also led by wealthy developed countries and is equally susceptible to accusations of vote-buying and influence-peddling. They accuse the anti-whaling side within the IWC of using conservation as a cover for its ideological opposition to whaling itself, which mirrors the accusation from the anti-whaling side that Japan's scientific whaling is a cover for commercial whaling. Since 2000, 29 new countries have joined the IWC, 18 of them pro-whaling, 11 anti. Japan notes that major anti-whaling countries such as the U.S., Australia, UK and New Zealand also donate aid to poor countries on the IWC and wield far more influence than Japan alone and thus they could easily be accused of the same tactics.

Japan is pushing to have secret ballot voting introduced at IWC meetings. Secret ballot voting would weaken accusations of Japanese vote-buying by making it impossible to monitor so-called client members' votes. From Japan's point of view, secret ballot voting would also reduce the powerful collective influence of the anti-whaling lobby on IWC members. One of the new 2006 members, Israel, which had been asked specifically to join by the US, voted consistently with the anti-whaling bloc. Belize, a country previously accused of having its vote bought and paid for by Japan by a number of countries and NGOs, shifted sides and consistently voted with the anti-whaling block at the 2006 IWC meeting. Anti-whaling governments oppose secret ballot voting on the grounds that it is without precedent in other international bodies and that it would remove accountability and make behind-the-scenes deals between delegations more likely. However, St Kitts and Nevis Commissioner, Cedric Liburd, argued during a debate on the secret ballot vote at the 2006 meeting that it was hypocritical of anti-whaling countries to pontificate on the need for transparency within the IWC by open voting when the same countries happily voted via secret ballot in CITES, a similar management body.

=== The role of the United States ===
The effectiveness of IWC decisions (at least on smaller whaling states) may be explained in large part by the fact that the United States has been willing to act unilaterally in support of them. The pro-whaling countries often see the U.S.'s propensity to act outside the IWC framework as "bullying" tactics, while environmentalists and the conservation lobby tend to applaud the U.S.'s approach.

The United States first incorporated the IWC's régime into domestic law in the 1971 Pelly Amendment to the Fisherman's Protective Act of 1967. This amendment provides that when the Secretary of Commerce determines that the nationals of a foreign country are diminishing the effectiveness of an international fishery conservation program (including the IWC's program), the Secretary shall certify this fact to the President. The President then has the discretion to ban importation of fishing products from the offending country. The United States has threatened sanctions under the Pelly Amendment on a number of occasions. In November 1974, pressure from the United States contributed to Japan and the Soviet Union complying with the 1974–1975 quotas. Similarly, in December 1978, Chile, South Korea and Peru acceded to the IWC after the United States certified them under the Amendment. The threatened certification of Spain also led that country to observe a fin whale quota to which it had objected.

These measures were further strengthened by the 1979 Packwood-Magnuson Amendment to the Fishery Conservation and Management Act of 1976. It provides that, when the Secretary of Commerce certifies that a country is diminishing the effectiveness of the work of the IWC, the Secretary of State must reduce that country's fishing allocation in U.S. waters by at least 50%. Certification under the Packwood-Magnuson Amendment also serves as certification under the Pelly Amendment. The threatened application in 1980 of the Packwood-Magnuson and Pelly Amendments led South Korea to agree to follow IWC guidelines restricting the use of cold (i.e. non-explosive) harpoons. Faced with similar pressure, the Republic of China (Taiwan) placed a complete ban on whaling in 1981. Without United States support, it is possible that the 1986 moratorium would have been substantially limited, as countries such as Iceland, Japan, Norway and the Soviet Union would have opted out and continued commercial whaling.

=== The North Atlantic Marine Mammal Commission ===
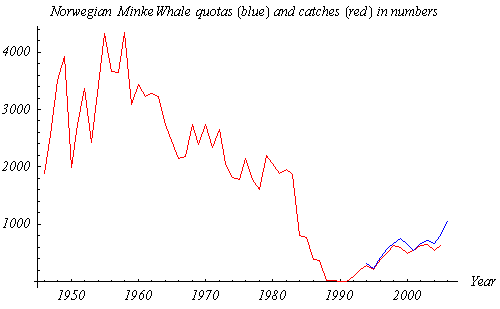
Norwegian minke whale quotas (blue line, 1994–2006) and catches (red line, 1946–2005)

The moratorium on commercial whaling led Iceland to withdraw in protest from the IWC, as it had threatened to do if the moratorium was extended. Japan and Norway also threatened to leave the organisation. In April 1992, the North Atlantic Marine Mammal Commission (NAMMCO) was established by the Faroe Islands, Greenland, Iceland, and Norway under the Agreement on Cooperation in Research, Conservation and Management of Marine Mammals in the North Atlantic. The document clearly responded to what the drafters regarded as the inappropriate whale protectionist tendencies of the IWC. Guðmundur Eiríksson of Iceland stated at NAMMCO's inaugural meeting that the organisation was established in part out of dissatisfaction with the IWC's zero-catch quota. Although NAMMCO does not conflict directly with the obligations of membership states under the IWC, it nonetheless presented a challenge to the legitimacy of the IWC.

== See also ==
- Institute of Cetacean Research (Japan)
- Whaling in Iceland
- Whaling in Japan
- Whaling in Norway
