= Baldred =

Baldred may refer to:

== People ==
- Baldred Bisset (c. 1260–c. 1311), medieval Scottish lawyer
- King Baldred of Kent, king of the Kentishmen, until 825
- Saint Baldred of Tyninghame (or Baldred of Strathclyde), Anglo-Saxon hermit and abbot, resident in East Lothian during the 8th century

== Others ==
- Baldred Rock, in Fitchie Bay at Laurie Island in the South Orkney Islands
