= Ross Peaks =

Mountain in South Orkney Islands

Ross Peaks (60°43′S 44°32′W) is a series of elevations rising to about 450 m and trending NW-SE between Ferguslie Peninsula and Fitchie Bay in Laurie Island, South Orkney Islands. Named by the United Kingdom Antarctic Place-Names Committee (UK-APC) in 1987 after Alastair Ross, taxidermist on the Scottish National Antarctic Expedition, 1902–04, led by W.S. Bruce.
