= Browns Bay (South Orkney Islands) =

Bay in Antarctica

Browns Bay (60°43′S 44°36′W) is a bay 1.5 miles (2.4 km) wide, entered between Thomson Point and Cape Geddes along the north coast of Laurie Island, in the South Orkney Islands. Charted in 1903 by the Scottish National Antarctic Expedition under Bruce, who named it for Robert Neal Rudmose-Brown, naturalist of the expedition.

== Sources ==
- Alberts, Fred G., ed. (1995), Geographic Names of the Antarctic (PDF) (2 ed.), United States Board on Geographic Names This article incorporates public domain material from websites or documents of the United States Board on Geographic Names.
