= Methuen Cove =

Cove in the South Orkney Islands off Antarctica

Methuen Cove (60°46′S 44°33′W) is a cove between Cape Anderson and Cape Whitson on the south coast of Laurie Island, in the South Orkney Islands off Antarctica. It was charted in 1903 by the Scottish National Antarctic Expedition under William Speirs Bruce, who named it after H. Methuen, the expedition's accountant.
