= William Johnston Thomson =

Scottish engineer and businessman

Sir William Johnston Thomson MIME
- Born: 1881
- Died: 18 September 1949 (aged 67–68)
- Occupations: Engineer, businessman
- Notable work: Scottish Motor Traction

Sir William Johnston Thomson MIME (1881–1949) was a Scottish engineer and businessman involved in the early automobile industry. He served two consecutive terms as Lord Provost of Edinburgh from 1932 to 1935. He established the first city-to-city bus services in Scotland.

== Life ==
Thomson was born in 1881 to a Caithness family.

He served his apprenticeship as an engineer at J & T Boyd, manufacturers of textile-making machines at Shettleston Ironworks in Glasgow. Around 1899 he joined the firm Pollock, McNab & Highgate based at Carntyne Station in Shettleston. Around 1900 he joined the newly created automobile manufacturer Arrol-Johnston.

In 1905 Thomson founded the Scottish Motor Traction Company (known as the SMT) which began operations at 9 Lauriston Street in south-west Edinburgh in 1906. In 1929 the company took over W. Alexander & Sons, its main rival, together with smaller Scottish bus companies, and thereafter had a near monopoly on public transport provision in central Scotland. In conjunction with LMS and LNER, the SMT group controlled most rail and road freight.

In 1932 he succeeded Thomas Barnby Whitson as Lord Provost of Edinburgh. At the end of his term of office, as was customary, he received a knighthood from George V. However, he then continued for a further term until 1935. He was succeeded by Louis Stewart Gumley.

Thomson died on 18 September 1949.
