= Jessie Bay =

Jessie Bay (60°44′S 44°44′W) is a bay 4 nautical miles (7 km) wide, lying between Mackenzie Peninsula and Pirie Peninsula, on the north side of Laurie Island in the South Orkney Islands. Apparently seen in the course of the joint cruise by Captain George Powell, a British sealer, and Captain Nathaniel Palmer, an American one. In 1821, it was roughly charted by Captain James Weddell, a British sealer. It was surveyed in 1903 by the Scottish National Antarctic Expedition of William S. Bruce, who named this bay for his wife, Jessie Mackenzie Bruce. He also named a cove in the bay, Sheila Cove, for his daughter.

== See also ==
- Expedition Rock
