= Expedition Rock =

Expedition Rock (60°42′S 44°44′W) is a submerged rock 1.5 nautical miles (3 km) east-northeast of Cape Robertson, lying in the entrance to Jessie Bay on the north side of Laurie Island, in the South Orkney Islands. It was charted by Petter Sorlle, 1912–15, and called "Aagot Gr"; it was recharted by Discovery Investigations in 1933 and named Expedition Rock.
