= Spine Island =

Island in the South Orkney archipelago

Spine Island (60°36′S 46°2′W) is a narrow island composed of several aligned rock segments, lying in Sandefjord Bay between the west end of Coronation Island and Monroe Island in the South Orkney Islands. It was discovered by Captain George Powell and Captain Nathaniel Palmer on the occasion of their joint cruise in 1821 and is so named because of its appearance by Discovery Investigations personnel on the Discovery II who surveyed the island in 1933.

== See also ==
- List of Antarctic and sub-Antarctic islands
