= Sheila Cove =

Cove in the South Orkney Islands

Sheila Cove (60°45′S 44°46′W) is a cove in the southwest part of Jessie Bay on the north coast of Laurie Island, in the South Orkney Islands. Surveyed and named by the Scottish National Antarctic Expedition, 1902–04, for Sheila Bruce, daughter of William S. Bruce, leader of the expedition.
