= Fitchie Bay =

Bay in Laurie Island, South Orkney Islands, British Antarctic Territory

Fitchie Bay (60°45′S 44°29′W) is a bay lying between Cape Dundas and Cape Whitson on the south side of Laurie Island, in the South Orkney Islands. It was charted in 1903 by the Scottish National Antarctic Expedition under William Speirs Bruce, who named it for John Fitchie, second mate of the expedition ship Scotia.

A series of peaks called the Ross Peaks rise between Ferguslie Peninsula and Fitchie Bay. Graptolite Island sits in the northeastern part of the bay.
