= Thomson Point =

Point in South Orkney Islands

- Headland
- Location within South Orkney Islands
- Coordinates: 60°43′S 44°38′W

Thomson Point is a point on the east side of Pirie Peninsula, 1.7 nautical miles (3.1 km) southeast of Cape Mabel, on the north coast of Laurie Island in the South Orkney Islands.

Charted in 1903 by the Scottish National Antarctic Expedition under William Speirs Bruce, who named it for J.A. (later Sir Arthur) Thomson, regius professor of natural history, University of Aberdeen, Scotland.
