= Thomas Barnby Whitson =

Sir Thomas Barnby Whitson FRSE DL EZS LLD (10 March 1869 – 1 October 1948) was a Scottish chartered accountant who served as Lord Provost of Edinburgh 1929 to 1932.

== Life ==
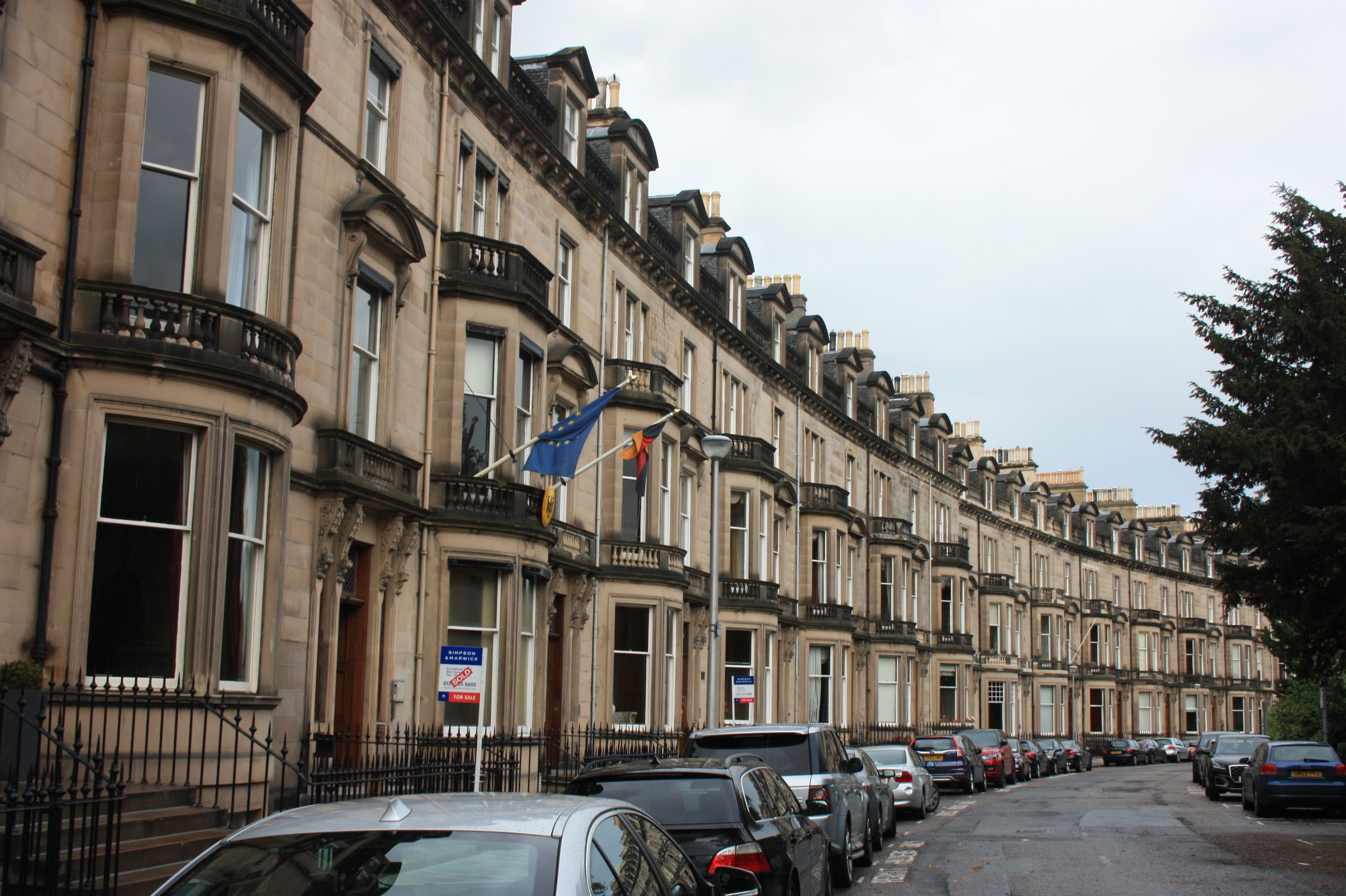
Eglinton Crescent, Edinburgh

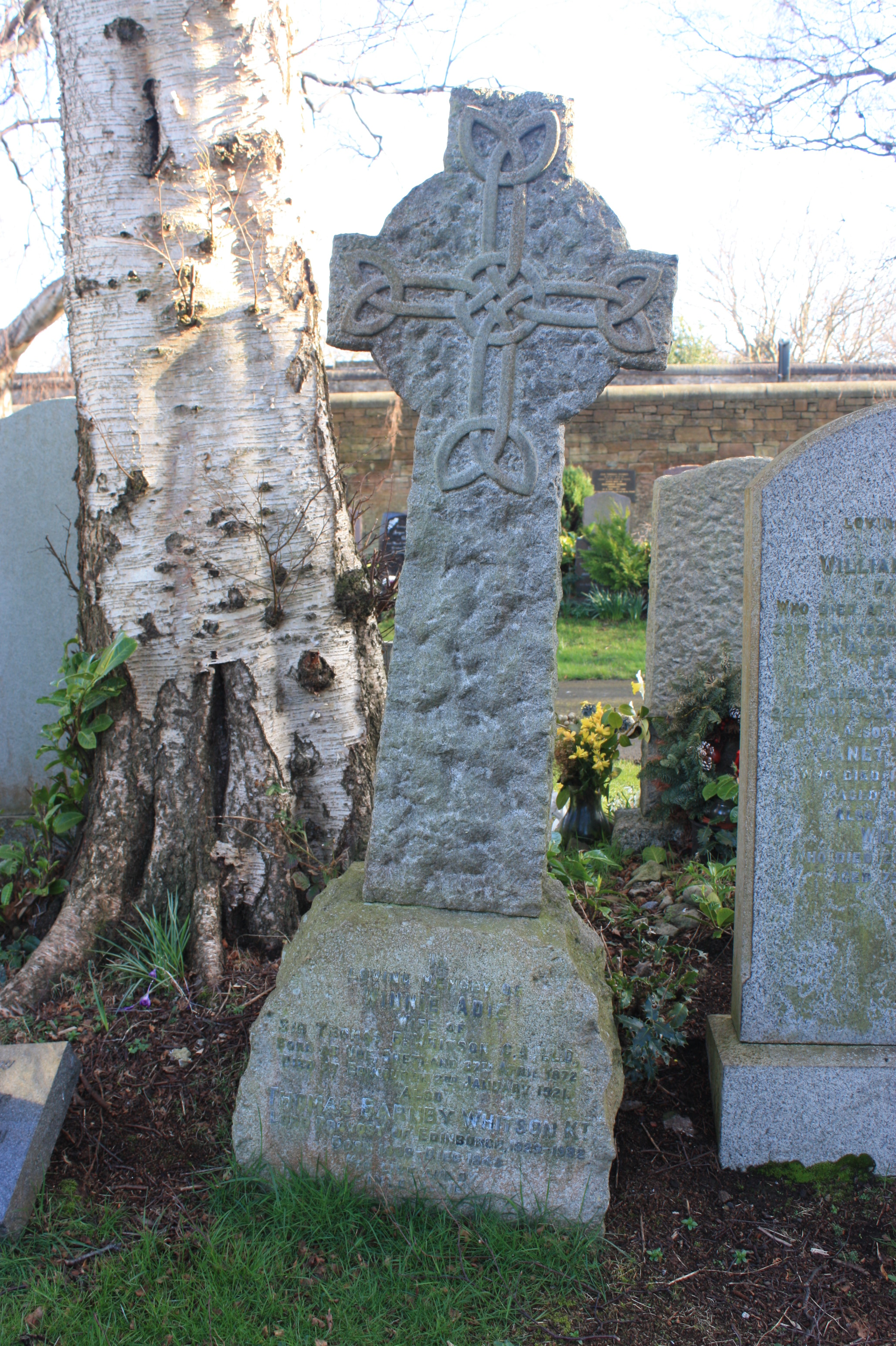
The grave of Sir Thomas Barnby Whitson, Dean Cemetery, Edinburgh

He was born on 10 March 1869 to Isobel Lowe and Thomas Whitson (b. 1834) in Blairgowrie), an Edinburgh chartered accountant. The family lived at 30a Minto Street in the Newington area of Edinburgh. He was educated at George Watsons College and Loretto College and then studied accountancy at the University of Edinburgh. He practiced as a chartered accountant continually from 1893. He was interested in Antarctic exploration, and although not undertaking the journey himself he underwrote part of the costs of William Spiers Bruce's explorations in the early 20th century. He also co-founded the Scottish Spitsbergen Syndicate.

He was knighted by King George V in 1931 during his period as Lord Provost. He received an honorary doctorate (LLD) from the University of Edinburgh in the same year. He was also in that year elected a Fellow of the Royal Society of Edinburgh. His proposers were James Watt, Ralph Allan Sampson, Sir Edward Albert Sharpey-Schafer and James Hartley Ashworth.

He was succeeded as Lord Provost in 1932 by the automobile engineer William Johnston Thomson.

He retired in 1943 and died on 1 October 1948 at his home at 27 Eglinton Crescent in Edinburgh's West End. He is buried with his first wife in the 20th century extension to Dean Cemetery in west Edinburgh. The hard to read granite monument stands beside a mature silver birch.

== Recognition ==
The Whitson estate in the Saughtonhall area of south-west Edinburgh is named after him, as is Cape Whitson in the South Orkneys and Whitson Bay in Spitzbergen.

== Family ==
He married twice: firstly in 1902 to Wilhelmina (“Winnie”) Jamieson Adie (1872-1921) of Delting in Shetland; secondly in 1922, following the death of Winnie, to Mabel Christian Forbes (d.1971), daughter of George Edward Forbes. He had three children by his first marriage.
