= Louis Stewart Gumley =

Scottish property agent (1870–1941)

Sir Louis Stewart Gumley LLD (7 May 1870 – 30 September 1941) was a Scottish property agent who founded the firm Gumleys and who served as Lord Provost of Edinburgh from 1935 to 1938. Gumleys merged in 1989 to become Speirs Gumley.

== Life ==
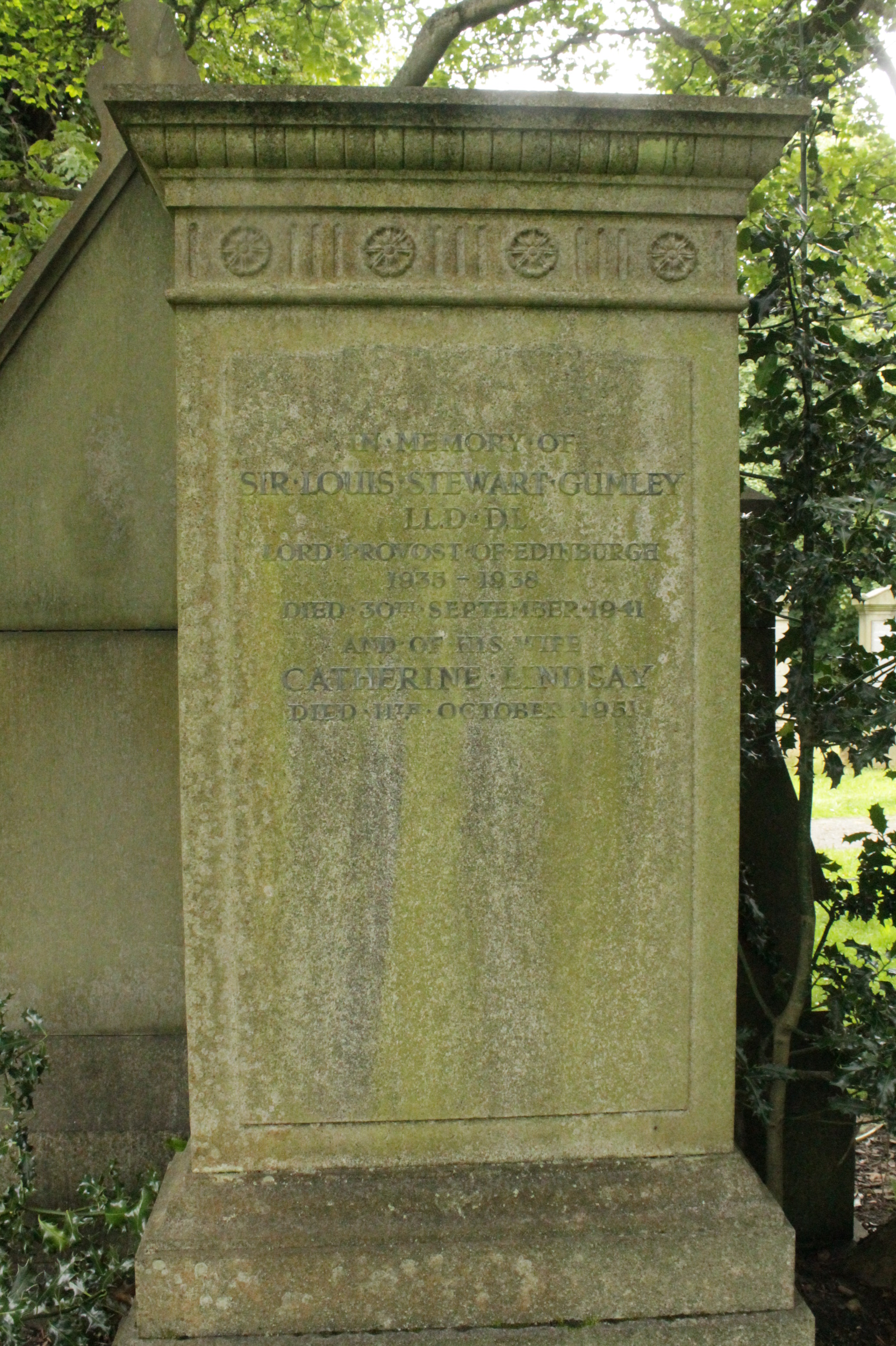
The grave of Louis Stewart Gumley, Warriston Cemetery

He was born in Dublin in Ireland on 7 May 1870 the son of Thomas Franc Sadler Gumley and his wife Wilhelmina Moffat.

He moved to Edinburgh around 1890 with his mother, following the death of his father, and they lived in a flat at 11 Howe Street.

He founded Gumleys in 1898 at 84 Leith Walk.

In 1910 he was running a property business at 89 Leith Walk and living at 3 Dundas Street in Edinburgh's Second New Town.

In 1935 he succeeded Sir William Johnston Thomson as Lord Provost of Edinburgh.

He died on 30 September 1941 at Bowness-on-Windermere in the Lake District but was returned to Edinburgh for burial in Warriston Cemetery in the north of the city. The grave lies at the west end of the upper section close to the main entrance path.

== Artistic recognition ==
His portrait by Stanley Cursiter was painted in 1937 and is held by City of Edinburgh Council.

== Recognition ==
He was knighted by King George V during his period as Lord Provost.

== Family ==
In 1901, he married Catherine Isabella Horne Lindsay (1876–1951). His sons included Charles Stewart Gumley WS (1908–1977) and Ronald Guthrie Tait Gumley (1912–1998).
