= Wilton Bay =

Bay in the South Orkney Islands

Wilton Bay (60°46′S 44°45′W) is a bay lying between Cape Davidson and Cape Hartree on the southwest side of Laurie Island in the South Orkney Islands. Charted in 1903 by the Scottish National Antarctic Expedition under Bruce, who named it after D.W. Wilton, zoologist of the expedition.
