= Mount Susini =

Mountain in the South Orkney Islands

Highest point
- Elevation: 370 m (1,210 ft)
- Coordinates: 60°43′S 44°48′W GNIS

Geography
- Location: Laurie Island, South Orkney Islands
- Parent range: Mackenzie Peninsula

Mount Susini is a mountain rising to 370 m at the northwest end of Mackenzie Peninsula, Laurie Island, in the South Orkney Islands. Named "Monte Susini" by an Argentine Antarctic Expedition, 1957. An English form of the name has been approved.
