= Sandefjord Bay (Coronation Island) =

Bay in the South Orkney Islands

Sandefjord Bay (60°37′S 46°03′W) is a narrow body of water on the west coast of Coronation Island in the South Orkney Islands of Antarctica. It is 2 mi (3.2 km) long and extends in a northeast–southwest direction between Coronation Island and Monroe Island.

Spine Island lies in the entrance of the bay. Just southwest of Spine Island is Mainsail Rock, which is the largest and easternmost of a chain of three rocks trending in a northwest–southeast direction off the southeast side of Monroe Island.

== History ==
The bay was discovered and roughly charted by Captain George Powell and Captain Nathaniel Palmer during their joint cruise in December 1821. The name Sandefjord was presumably chosen for Sandefjord, Norway, which was the center of the Norwegian whaling industry. The name appears to have been first used on a 1912 chart by Petter Sørlle, a Norwegian whaling captain. The feature was surveyed by Discovery Investigations (DI) personnel in 1933, who named Mainsail Rock at the same time.

The British Antarctic Survey constructed a hut on Sandefjord Bay in 1945 with the intention of establishing a research base. However, there were never enough personnel to occupy the base and it was abandoned in favor of Station C on Ferguslie Peninsula without ever being used. It was last seen standing in September 1950, and had collapsed by February 1955. Only debris remains.
