= Martha Rojas Urrego =

Biologist

- Education: University of Los Andes University of Montpellier University of Aberdeen
- Occupations: Secretary General, Ramsar Convention on Wetlands
- Predecessor: Christopher Briggs

Martha Rojas Urrego is a biologist, ecologist and humanitarian, gender and environmental advocate. She is a Colombian and French national. In August 2016 she was appointed as the Secretary General of the Ramsar Convention on Wetlands. Previously she was Head of Global Advocacy and Acting Deputy Secretary General at humanitarian organization CARE International.

== Life and work ==
Martha Rojas Urrego has a bachelor's degree in Biology from the University of Los Andes, Colombia. She also studied at the University of Montpellier, France, where she obtained a Specialized Higher Studies Diploma (DESS) in Ecology and Management of Natural Environment. She also holds a Master of Science in Geography from the University of Aberdeen, United Kingdom.

As Executive Director of the National Park Service in Colombia, she led policy development, planning and management of the 42 protected areas of National Parks System. In 1994 she worked on the transformation of Colombia's National Institute of Renewable Natural Resources and Environment (INDERENA) into the Ministry of Environment.

Later in 1994 she moved to Switzerland to work as Biodiversity Policy Advisor at the International Union for Conservation of Nature (IUCN). In 2002 she was named Head of IUCN's Global Policy Unit and for seven years she oversaw development of IUCN global policy strategies in biodiversity, climate change, energy, poverty and trade and financing for development. She led the Union's engagement with the Convention on Biological Diversity (CBD), the United Nations Framework Convention on Climate Change (UNFCCC), the World Trade Organization (WTO), the UN Environment Programme (UNEP), the World Bank, the Global Environmental Facility (GEF) and the Inter-American Development Bank.

She joined CARE International, a humanitarian organization, in 2009 as Head of Global Advocacy. She led local to global policy work on poverty-fighting development and humanitarian aid with a strong focus on gender equality and women's empowerment. She managed CARE's representation to the United Nations in New York and European Union in Brussels. As Acting Deputy Secretary General she managed the governance functions of CARE International, a confederation of 14 independent member organisations working together to end poverty in more than 80 countries, which directly reached 83 million people in 2012.

In August 2016 she was appointed as the Secretary General of the Ramsar Convention on Wetlands. She provides leadership for the further implementation of the Convention by 169 Contracting Parties.

In 2023, Urrego started her role as Executive Secretary of the International Whaling Commission.

== Other activities ==
- IUCN Commission of Environmental, Economic, and Social Policy, Member
- IUCN European Union Policy Advisory Group (EUPAG), Co-Chair
- IUCN World Commission on Protected Areas, Member

== Selected publications ==
- Opinion piece, Mother Nature vs. Climate Change, by Martha Rojas Urrego, Secretary-General of the Ramsar Convention on Wetlands, and Patricia Espinosa, Executive Secretary of the United Nations Framework Convention on Climate Change (UNFCCC), 2016
- Advocacy, People, Planet, Prosperity, Peace, and Partnerships, CARE International, 2015
