= Ferrier Peninsula =

Peninsula of Antarctica

Coordinates: 60°44′S 44°26′W

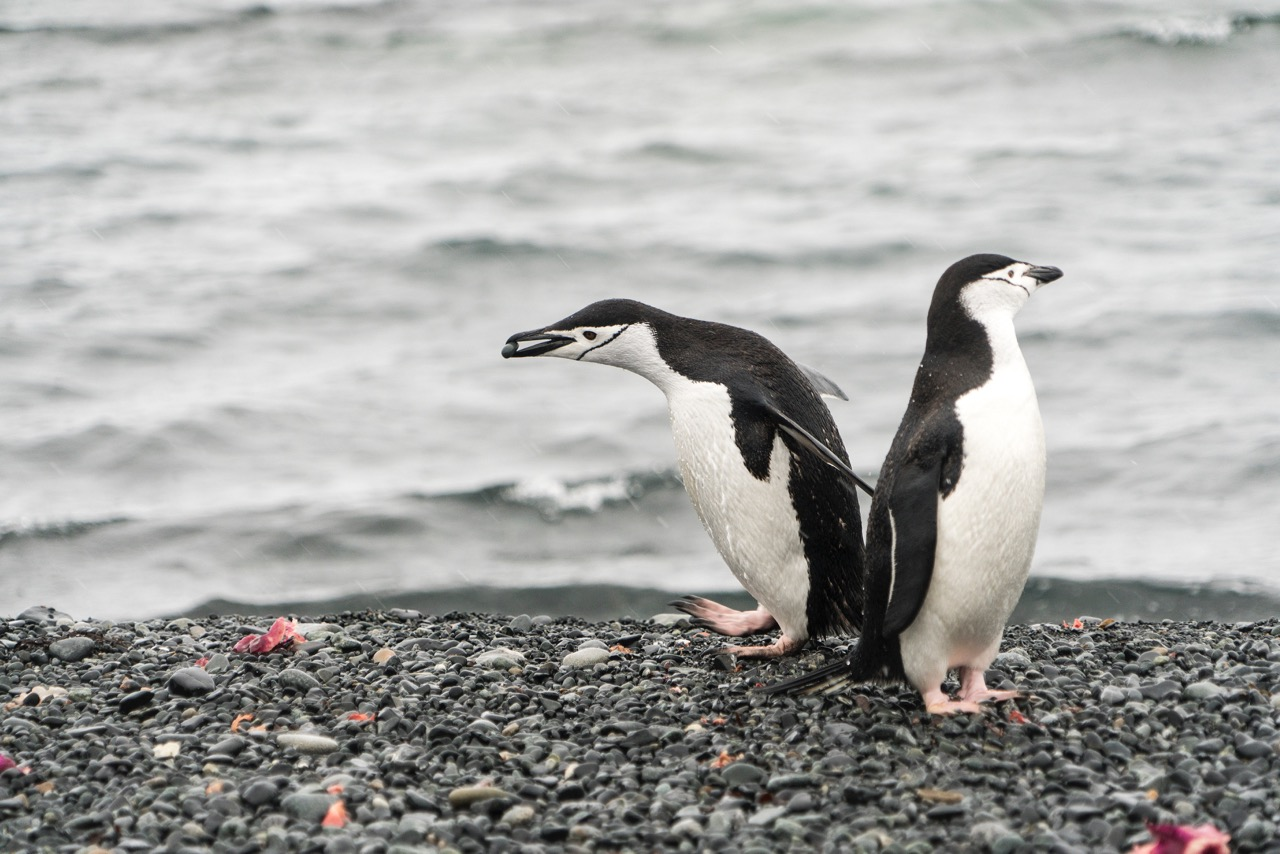
Chinstrap penguins breed in the IBA

Ferrier Peninsula is a narrow peninsula, 2.4 km (1.5 mi) long, forming the eastern end of Laurie Island in the South Orkney Islands of Antarctica. It was roughly charted in 1823 by a British sealing expedition under James Weddell. It was surveyed in 1903 by the Scottish National Antarctic Expedition under William Speirs Bruce, who named it for his secretary J.G. Ferrier, who was also manager in Scotland of the expedition.

== Important Bird Area ==
The peninsula, along with the nearby Graptolite Island, has been identified as an Important Bird Area (IBA) by BirdLife International because it supports a large breeding colony of about 91,000 pairs of Adélie penguins as well as 14,000 pairs of chinstrap penguins. Gentoo penguins were reported nesting on the peninsula in 1947.
