= North Atlantic Marine Mammal Commission =

The North Atlantic Marine Mammal Commission (NAMMCO) is an international regional body for co-operation on conservation, management and study of marine mammals in the North Atlantic.

The NAMMCO Agreement was signed in Nuuk, Greenland on 9 April 1992 by Norway, Iceland, Greenland, and the Faroe Islands, and entered into force 90 days later on 8 July 1992. The agreement focuses on modern approaches to the study of the marine ecosystem as a whole, and better understanding of marine mammals' role in this system.

The organization came about because the member nations were (and continue to be) dissatisfied with the international management of cetaceans and other marine mammals by the International Whaling Commission. NAMMCO believes that decisions regarding whaling should be based on scientific principles regarding management of whale populations. Through regional cooperation, the member nations of NAMMCO aim to strengthen and further develop effective conservation and management measures for marine mammals. Such measures should be based on the best available scientific evidence, and should take into account both the complexity and vulnerability of the marine ecosystem, and the rights and needs of coastal communities to make a sustainable living from what the sea can provide.

The IWC currently has a moratorium in effect which prohibits all (large species) whaling with a few specific exceptions. Nations opposed to whaling, such as the United Kingdom, do not recognize NAMMCO's claim to be the proper body for management of whale stocks in the North Atlantic, and continue to support the IWC.

== History and structure ==
NAMMCO was founded in Nuuk, Greenland on 9 April 1992 by the signatories to Agreement on Cooperation in Research, Conservation and Management of Marine Mammals in the North Atlantic. The Agreement came into force on 7 July 1992 and was itself the product of a Memorandum of Understanding signed in Tromsø in 1990 between the Norwegian and Icelandic governments and the Greenlandic and Faroese home rule governments. The purpose of the organization is set out in Article 2 of the agreement.

The commission has three parts. The council is the decision-making part of the commission, which requests, and acts on, advice from its management committees, which make proposals for management of marine mammals stocks within the region, and from the scientific committee which reviews current scientific literature and carries out its own scientific research.

The commission also hosts workshops and forums devoted to hunting methods and environmental questions.
