= Cape Whitson =

Headland of Antarctica

Coordinates: 60°45′S 44°32′W

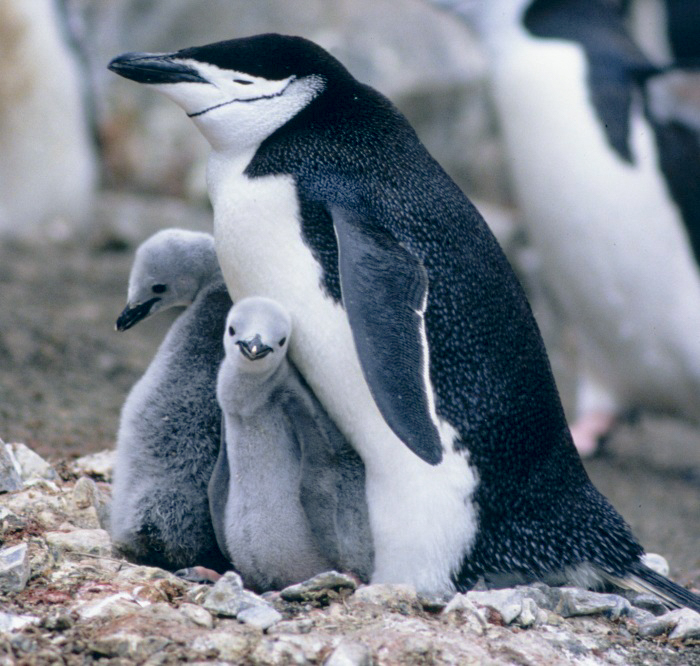
The cape is an important breeding site for chinstrap penguins

Cape Whitson, is a headland on the south coast of Laurie Island, the easternmost and second largest of the South Orkney Islands of Antarctica. It lies about 9 km south-east of Argentina’s Orcadas Base.

It is named after Sir Thomas Barnby Whitson, Lord Provost of Edinburgh at the time of its full mapping in the 1930s by the Edinburgh map-makers J.G.Bartholomew & Sons.

== Important Bird Area ==
Cape Whitson has been identified as an Important Bird Area (IBA) by BirdLife International because it supports a large breeding colony of about 13,000 pairs of chinstrap penguins. The 54 ha IBA comprises the ice-free land of the cape, extending for 1.5 kilometres (0.93 mi) between Aitken Cove and Methuen Cove. It has an elevation of less than 250 metres (820 ft).
