= Cape Davidson =

Headland of Antarctica

Coordinates: 60°46′S 44°46′W

- Interactive map of Cape Davidson

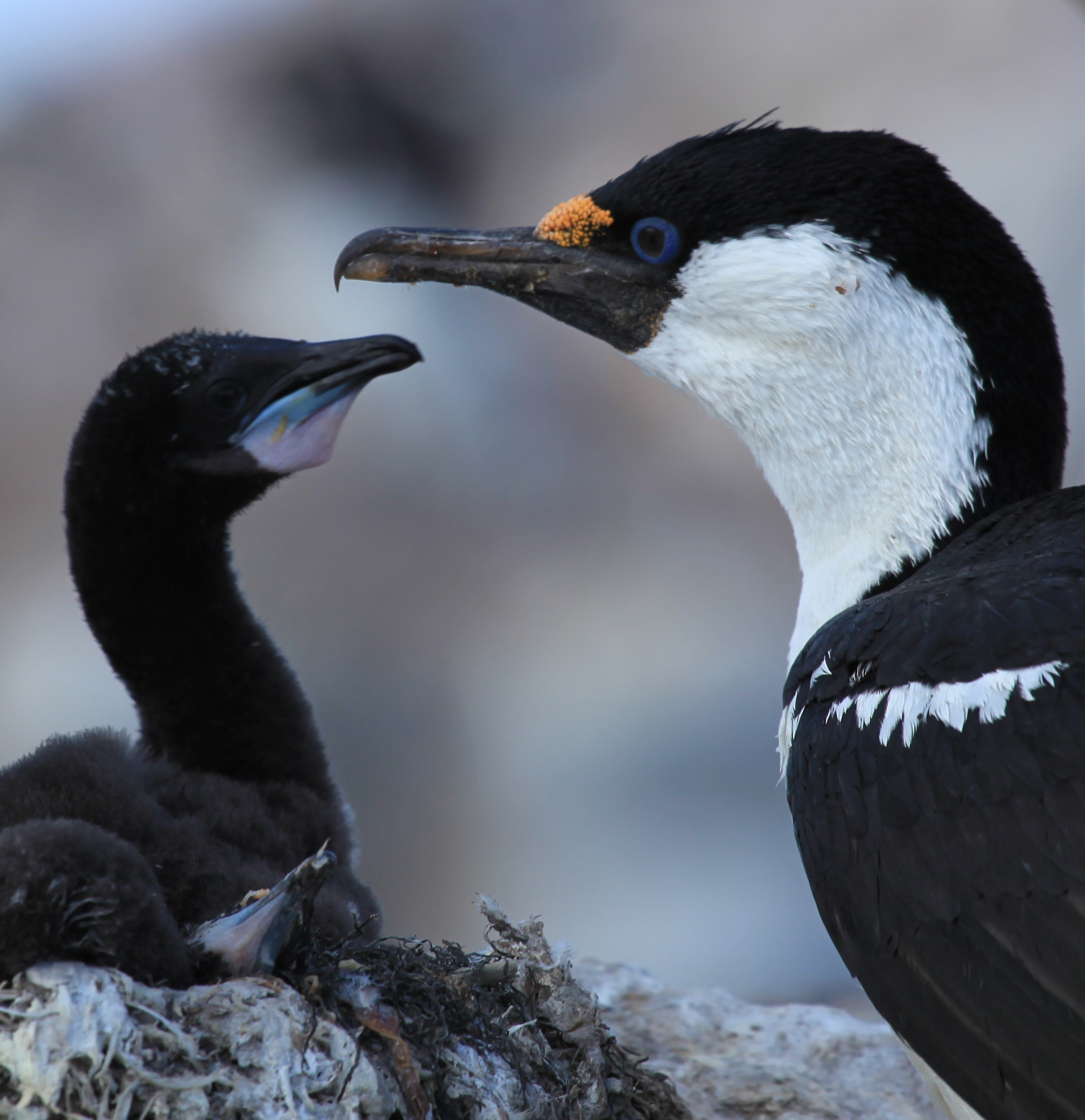
Antarctic shags breed in the IBA

Cape Davidson is a cape which marks the southernmost part of Mackenzie Peninsula and the west side of the entrance to Wilton Bay, in the west part of Laurie Island in the South Orkney Islands of Antarctica. It was charted in 1903 by the Scottish National Antarctic Expedition under William Speirs Bruce, who named it for J. Davidson, first mate of the expedition ship Scotia.

== Important Bird Area ==
A small (2.8 hectares [6.9 acres]) rocky islet lying about one kilometre (0.62 mi) offshore from the cape has been identified as an Important Bird Area (IBA) by BirdLife International because it supports a breeding colony of Antarctic shags, with about 225 pairs recorded there in 1983.
