= Mackenzie Peninsula =

Peninsula in South Orkney Islands

Mackenzie Peninsula

Mackenzie Peninsula (60°45′S 44°48′W) is a steep, rocky peninsula forming the western end of Laurie Island, in the South Orkney Islands, Antarctica. It was first seen and roughly charted by Captain George Powell and Captain Nathaniel Palmer in 1821. It was surveyed in 1903 by the Scottish National Antarctic Expedition under William S. Bruce, who gave this peninsula the maiden name of his wife, Jessie Mackenzie.

On the northern side of the peninsula is Jessie Bay. On the south is Cape Davidson.

Mount Susini is located at the northwest end of Mackenzie Peninsula.
