= Graptolite Island =

Island of the South Orkney Islands of Antarctica

Coordinates: 60°44′S 44°28′W

Graptolite Island is an island 0.8 km (0.50 mi) long in the north-east part of Fitchie Bay, lying off the south-east portion of Laurie Island in the South Orkney Islands of Antarctica. James Weddell's chart published in 1825 shows two islands in essentially this position. Existence of a single island was determined in 1903 by the Scottish National Antarctic Expedition under William Speirs Bruce, who so named it because what were thought to be graptolite fossils were found there. Later analysis showed that the fossils on Graptolite Island were merely the remains of ancient plants.

== Geology ==
The bedrock of Graptolite Island consists entirely of a geologic unit known formally as the Greywacke Shale Formation. It consists of beds of Permian to Triassic sandstone (feldspathic arenite and feldspathic wacke) interbedded with beds of siltstone, mudstone, and diamictite. These beds were deposited by turbidity currents as turbidites in submarine fans and later metamorphosed to between anchizone to upper greenschist-facies during the late Triassic and early Jurassic.

Graptolite Island, like the rest of the South Orkney Islands, is the surface expression of the otherwise submerged South Orkney Microcontinent. This microcontinent is the biggest fragment, 250 km × 350 km (160 mi × 220 mi), of continental crust of the South Scotia Ridge lying between Antarctic and Scotia plates.

== Important Bird Area ==
The island, along with the nearby Ferrier Peninsula, has been identified as an Important Bird Area (IBA) by BirdLife International because together they support a large breeding colony of about 91,000 pairs of Adélie penguins as well as 14,000 pairs of chinstrap penguins.

== See also ==
- List of Antarctic and subantarctic islands
