= Aitken Cove =

Scottish cove

Aitken Cove (60°45′S 44°32′W) is a cove which lies immediately northeast of Cape Whitson, along the south coast of Laurie Island in the South Orkney Islands in the Southern Ocean. Charted in 1903 by the Scottish National Antarctic Expedition under William Speirs Bruce, who named it for A.N.G. Aitken, solicitor to the expedition.
