= International Convention for the Regulation of Whaling =

International environmental agreement

The International Convention for the Regulation of Whaling is an international environmental agreement aimed at the "proper conservation of whale stocks and thus make possible the orderly development of the whaling industry". It governs the commercial, scientific, and aboriginal subsistence whaling practices of 88 member states.

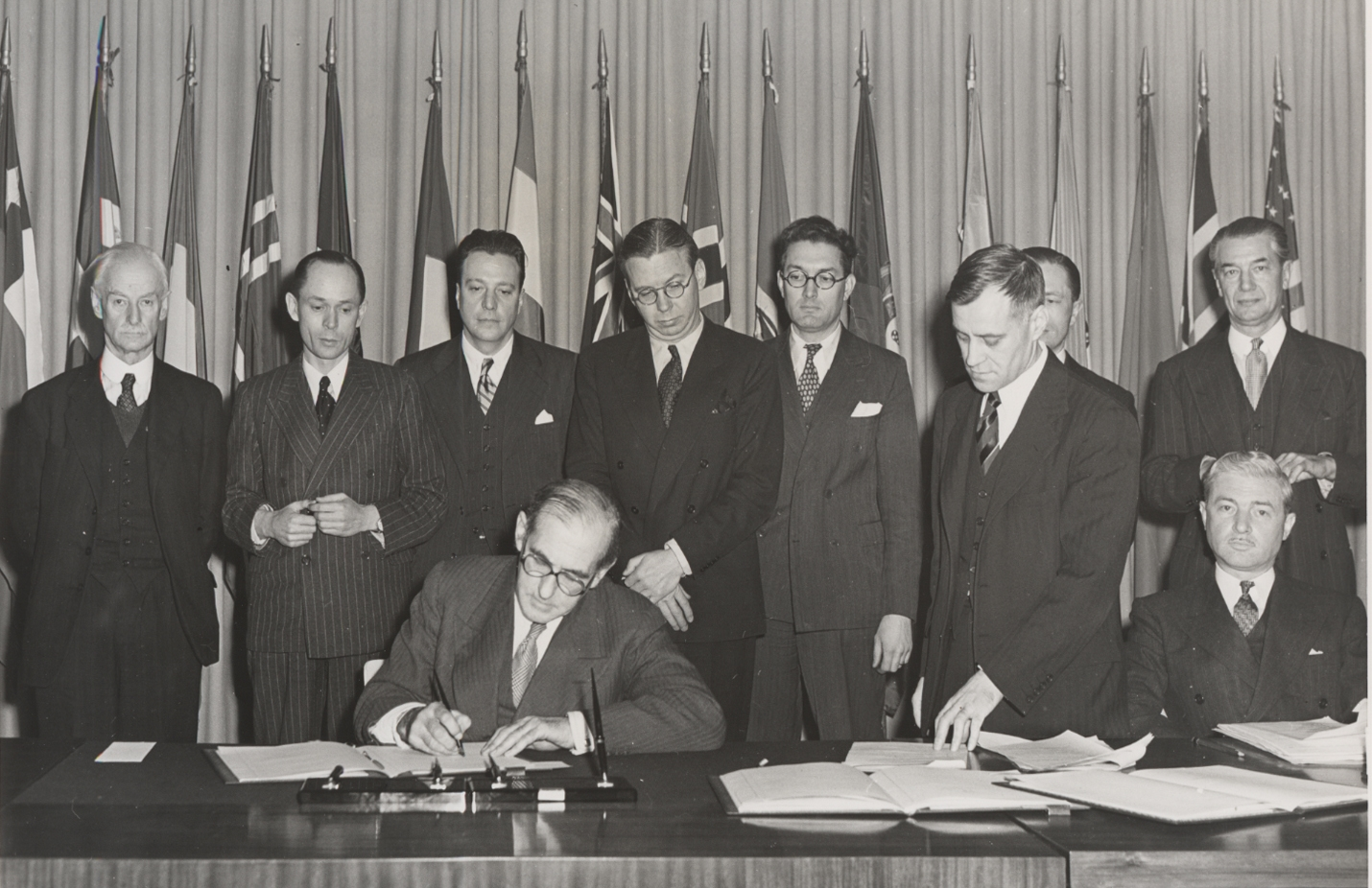
Signing of the International Convention for the Regulation of Whaling in Washington DC, 2 December 1946.

The convention is a successor to the 1931 Geneva Convention for Regulation of Whaling and the 1937 International Agreement for the Regulation of Whaling, established in response to the overexploitation of whales in the post-World War I period. Neither instrument was effective, but each provided the framework for the International Convention for the Regulation of Whaling, which was spearheaded by the United States and signed by 15 countries in Washington, D.C., on 3 December 1946; the convention took effect on 10 November 1948. A protocol broadening the scope of the convention's enforcement was signed on 19 November 1956.

The objectives of the International Convention for the Regulation of Whaling are to protect all whale species from overhunting; establish a system of international regulation for whale fisheries to ensure proper conservation and development of whale stocks; and safeguard for future generations the important natural resources represented by whale stocks. The primary instrument implementing these aims is the International Whaling Commission, established by the convention as its main decision-making body. The IWC meets annually and adopts a binding "schedule" that regulates catch limits, whaling methods, protected areas, and the right to carry out scientific research involving the killing of whales.

== Members ==
States-parties to the International Convention for the Regulation of Whaling (in blue)

As of January 2021, there are 88 parties to the convention. The initial signatories were Argentina, Australia, Brazil, Canada, Chile, Denmark, France, the Netherlands, New Zealand, Norway, Peru, South Africa, the Soviet Union, the United Kingdom and the United States.

Although Norway is party to the convention, it maintains an objection to the 1986 IWC global moratorium and it does not apply to it.

=== Withdrawals ===
Ten states have withdrawn from the convention since its ratification: Canada, Egypt, Greece, Guatemala, Jamaica, Japan, Mauritius, the Philippines, Seychelles and Venezuela.

Belize, Brazil, Dominica, Ecuador, Iceland, New Zealand, Norway, Panama, Solomon Islands, Sweden and Uruguay withdrew from the convention temporarily but joined again; the Netherlands withdrew twice, only to join a third time.

Japan is the most recent member to withdraw, effective June 2019, so as to resume commercial whaling.

== Effectiveness ==
There have been consistent disagreement over the scope of the convention. The 1946 Convention does not define a 'whale'. Some members of IWC claim that it has the legal competence to regulate catches of only great whales (the baleen whales and the sperm whale). Others believe that all cetaceans, including the smaller dolphins and porpoises, fall within IWC jurisdiction.

An analysis by the Carnegie Council determined that while the International Convention for the Regulation of Whaling has had "ambiguous success" owing to its internal divisions, it has nonetheless "successfully managed the historical transition from open whale hunting to highly restricted hunting. It has stopped all but the most highly motivated whale-hunting countries. This success has made its life more difficult, since it has left the hardest part of the problem for last."
