= Ferguslie Peninsula =

Peninsula of Antarctica

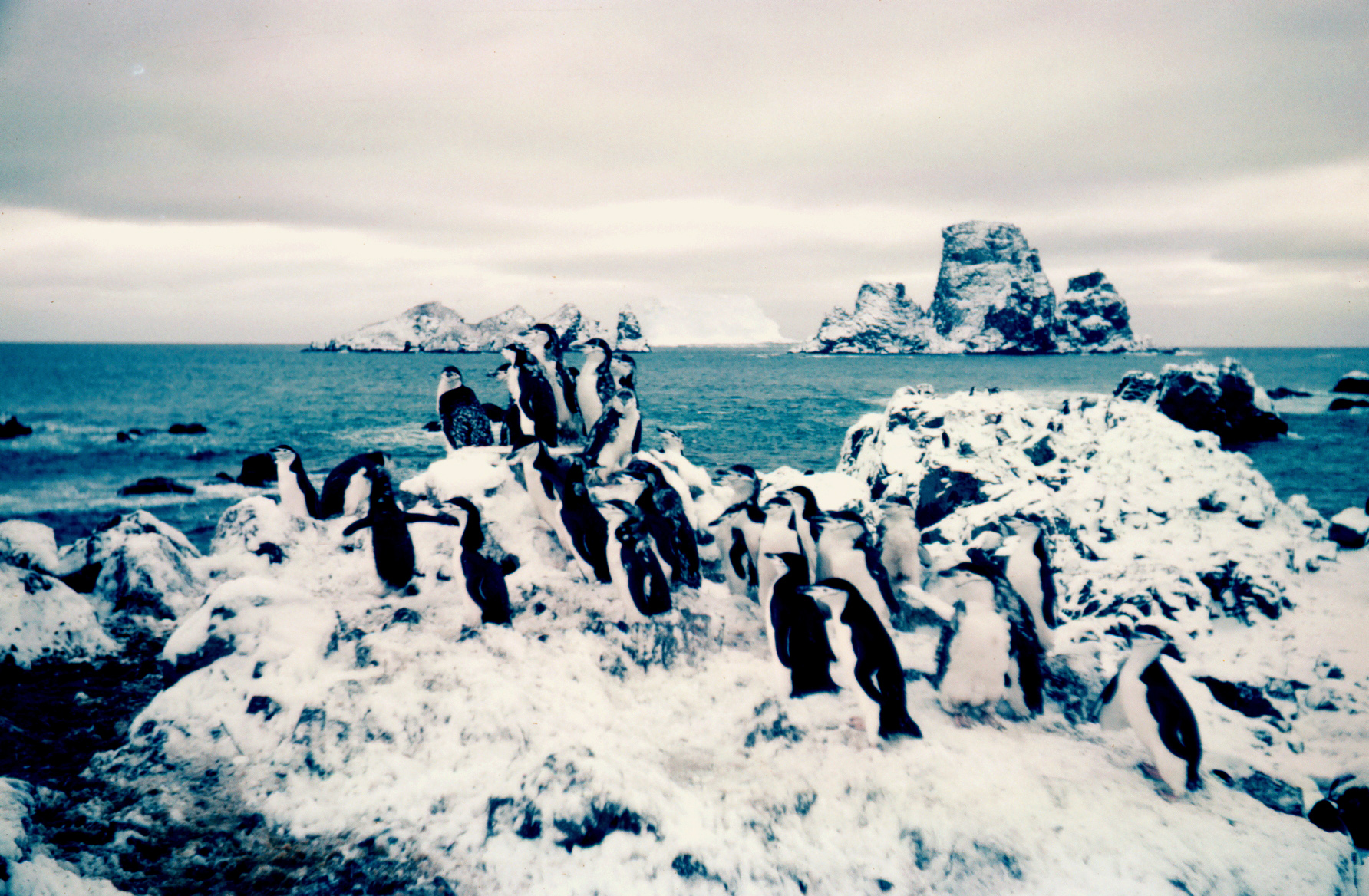
Chinstrap penguins at Cape Geddes in 1962

Ferguslie Peninsula is a peninsula 2.4 km (1.5 mi) long, lying between Browns Bay and Macdougal Bay on the north coast of Laurie Island, in the South Orkney Islands of Antarctica. The peninsula was charted in 1903 by the Scottish National Antarctic Expedition under William Speirs Bruce, who named it for Ferguslie, the residence of James Coats, chief patron of the expedition.

Cape Geddes forms the tip of the peninsula. It was named by Bruce for Professor Patrick Geddes, a noted Scottish biologist and sociologist.

A series of peaks called the Ross Peaks rise between Ferguslie Peninsula and Fitchie Bay.

== Important Bird Area ==
A 99 hectares (240 acres) tract of ice-free land, including Cape Geddes and the eastern side of the peninsula, has been identified as an Important Bird Area (IBA) by BirdLife International because it supports a large breeding colony of about 12,000 pairs of chinstrap penguins. Other birds nesting at the site include over 200 pairs of southern giant petrels at Cape Geddes.

== Station C ==
Station C
- Antarctic research station
- Interactive map of Station C
- Coordinates: 60°41′15″S 44°34′23″W
- Established: January 1946
- Closed: March 1947

Government
  - Type: Administration
  - Body: BAS, United Kingdom
- Active times: One summer

After abandoning their plans for a base at Sandefjord Bay, the British Antarctic Survey built a research base on Cape Geddes, designated Station C. It operated from January 1946 to March 1947, but was closed in favor of Station H on Signy Island (later Signy Research Station).
