= Pirie Peninsula =

Peninsula of Antarctica

Coordinates: 60°42′S 44°39′W

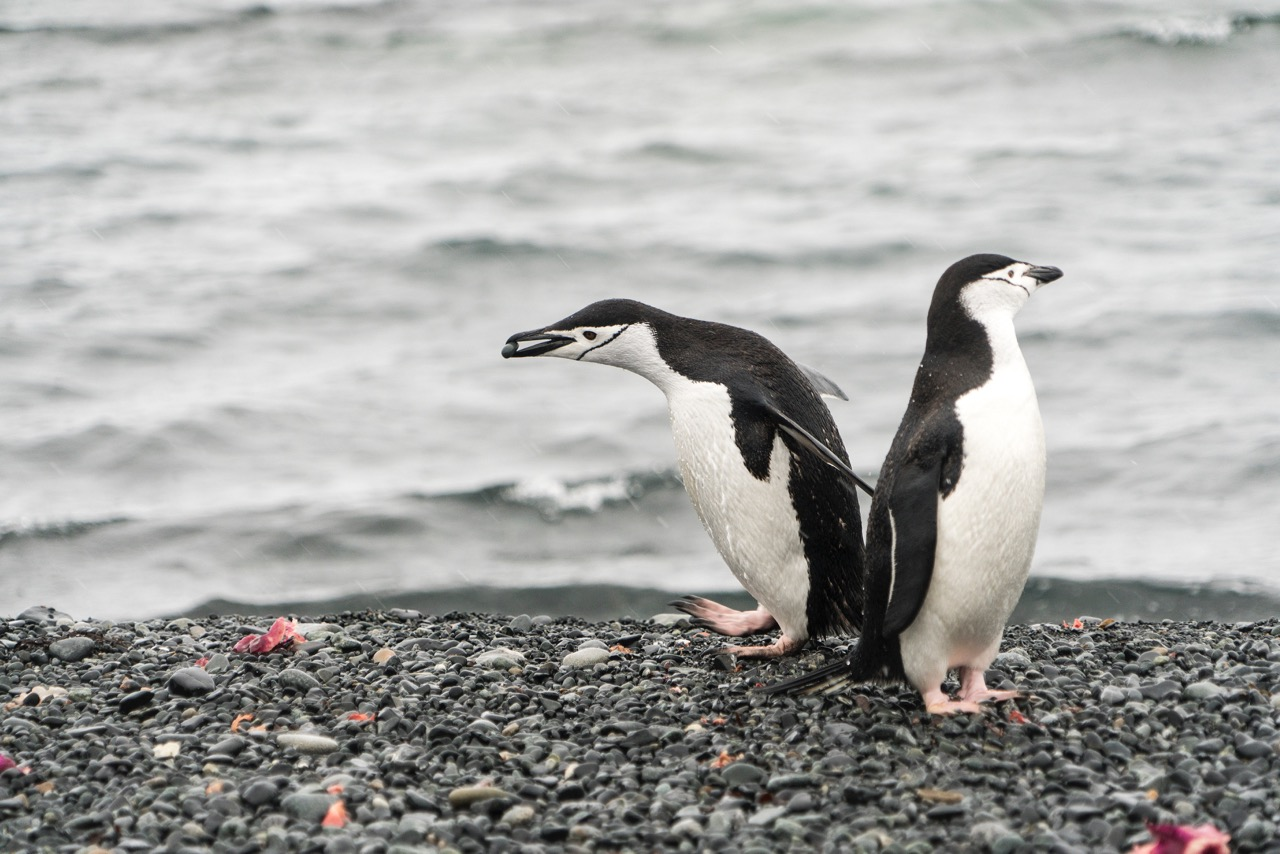
Chinstrap penguins breed in the IBA

Pirie Peninsula is a narrow peninsula extending 6 km (3.7 mi) northward from the center of Laurie Island, in the South Orkney Islands of Antarctica. The peninsula was surveyed in 1903 by the Scottish National Antarctic Expedition under Bruce, who named it for Dr Harvey Pirie, surgeon and geologist of the expedition.

== Important Bird Area ==
The peninsula has been identified as an Important Bird Area (IBA) by BirdLife International because it supports a breeding colony of about 14,000 pairs of chinstrap penguins. Other birds nesting at the site in smaller numbers include Cape petrels (3800 pairs) and imperial shags (170 pairs).
