= Whale sanctuaries =

Marine protected area where killing of whales is banned

A whale sanctuary is a marine protected area in which the killing or capture of whales within their natural habitat is banned (not to be confused with a permanent seaside sanctuary for retired captive whales). The first was created in 1946. The largest whale sanctuaries, the Indian Ocean Whale Sanctuary (established in 1979) and Southern Ocean Whale Sanctuary (1994), are in international waters so are administered by the International Whaling Commission. Others like the Hawaiian Islands Humpback Whale National Marine Sanctuary or the Uruguayan Whale and Dolphin Sanctuary are within nations' exclusive economic zones and territorial waters. There is some debate over the effectiveness of whale sanctuaries as a tool for protecting whale populations.

== Origins ==
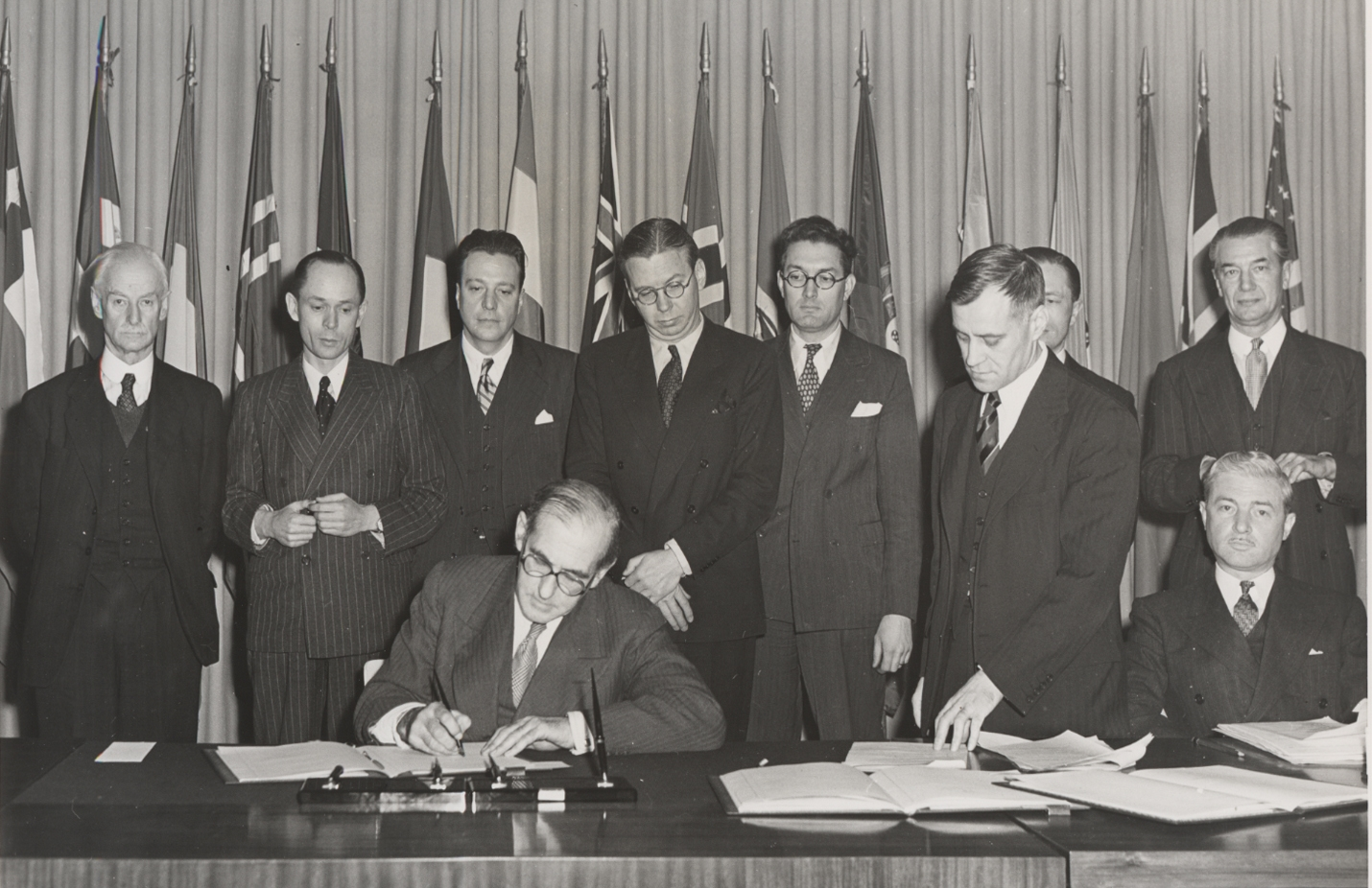
The signing of the International Convention for the Regulation of Whaling in Washington D.C. on 2 December 1946

The concept of a sanctuary for whales on the high seas was first proposed by a committee, led by the Argentine lawyer José León Suárez, to the League of Nations in 1929. In 1938 and 1939 international whaling conferences recommended the creation of whale sanctuaries, especially in the Southern Ocean, but World War II suspended these plans. After the war, the 1946 International Convention for the Regulation of Whaling (ICRW) included from the 1938 agreement a provision to establish sanctuaries, and the International Whaling Commission (IWC) was empowered to designate them. When designating a whale sanctuary, the only regulation permitted to the IWC is to ban the harvest of all whales in a designated area, regardless of their conservation status. Sanctuaries were deemed necessary for conservation purposes alone, not just to protect whale stocks and support the growth of the whaling industry.

In 1946 in the first IWC schedule a sanctuary for baleen whales was established in the Southern Ocean below 40°S, between 70°W to 160°W (from the coast of Chile almost to the Chatham Islands). Japan objected, first as an occupied country that was not a part of the 1946 negotiations, then as the whaling nation most disadvantaged by a sanctuary in the southern Pacific Ocean. Abolishing the sanctuary would, it was suggested, ease the whaling pressure on the rest of the Antarctic. IWC scientists countered by recommending the Blue Whale Unit quota for baleen whales be reduced instead, but in 1955 after years of challenges they compromised and agreed to the suspension of the sanctuary, supposedly for three years but in fact indefinitely. In later years many other sanctuaries were proposed—in the South Atlantic, the Northwest Atlantic, the Northeast Pacific, and the Southwest Pacific—but establishing any of them would require the agreement of three quarters of IWC member states.

== Indian Ocean Whale Sanctuary ==
In 1965 the Sri Lankan biologist P.E.P. Deraniyagala proposed a whale sanctuary in the Indian Ocean between 20°E and 118°E and extending into the Southern Ocean; the paper was published in an obscure Sri Lankan journal and mostly ignored. In 1978 the newly-independent Republic of Seychelles joined the IWC, with a record of conservation and the legal protection of its land and marine EEZ. By this time zero catch limits had been set for most baleen whales, except for the minke whale and Bryde's whale, and pelagic whaling was banned north of 40°S. Despite this, Japanese whalers were interested in harvesting Bryde's whales in the Indian Ocean from a land-based station in Madagascar, and in 1979 proposed an annual catch limit of 460 Bryde's whales from this population. The IWC Scientific Committee disagreed, and zero catch limits were set for the Indian Ocean. The ban on pelagic whaling did not apply to sperm whales (Physeter macrocephalus) however, and Soviet whaling ships had been catching large numbers of these, secretly and illegally, on their way to and from the Antarctic across the Indian Ocean.

1984 stamp from the Seychelles, part of a series commemorating whale conservation

In 1979 the Seychelles proposed the entire Indian Ocean be designated a whale sanctuary as far south as the Antarctic ice, protecting all species of baleen whales as well as sperm whales and orca. The Seychelles declared its entire EEZ a protected zone for marine mammals, and encouraged coastal states around the Indian Ocean to do the same. The Seychelles also suggested those coastal states join the IWC to help the proposal reach the required three-quarters majority (only Australia, South Africa and the Seychelles were members), though this could not be done before the 1979 IWC meeting. At that meeting the Seychelles delegation thus had to compromise, limiting the southern extent of the sanctuary to 55°S and establishing it initially for ten years with a five-year review period. In subsequent years the Indian Ocean states Oman, Kenya, Egypt, India, and Mauritius joined the IWC, and the Seychelles proposed that catch limits for all whale species be set to zero. This became the basis for the IWC's 1982 global moratorium on commercial whaling.

== Southern Ocean Whale Sanctuary ==
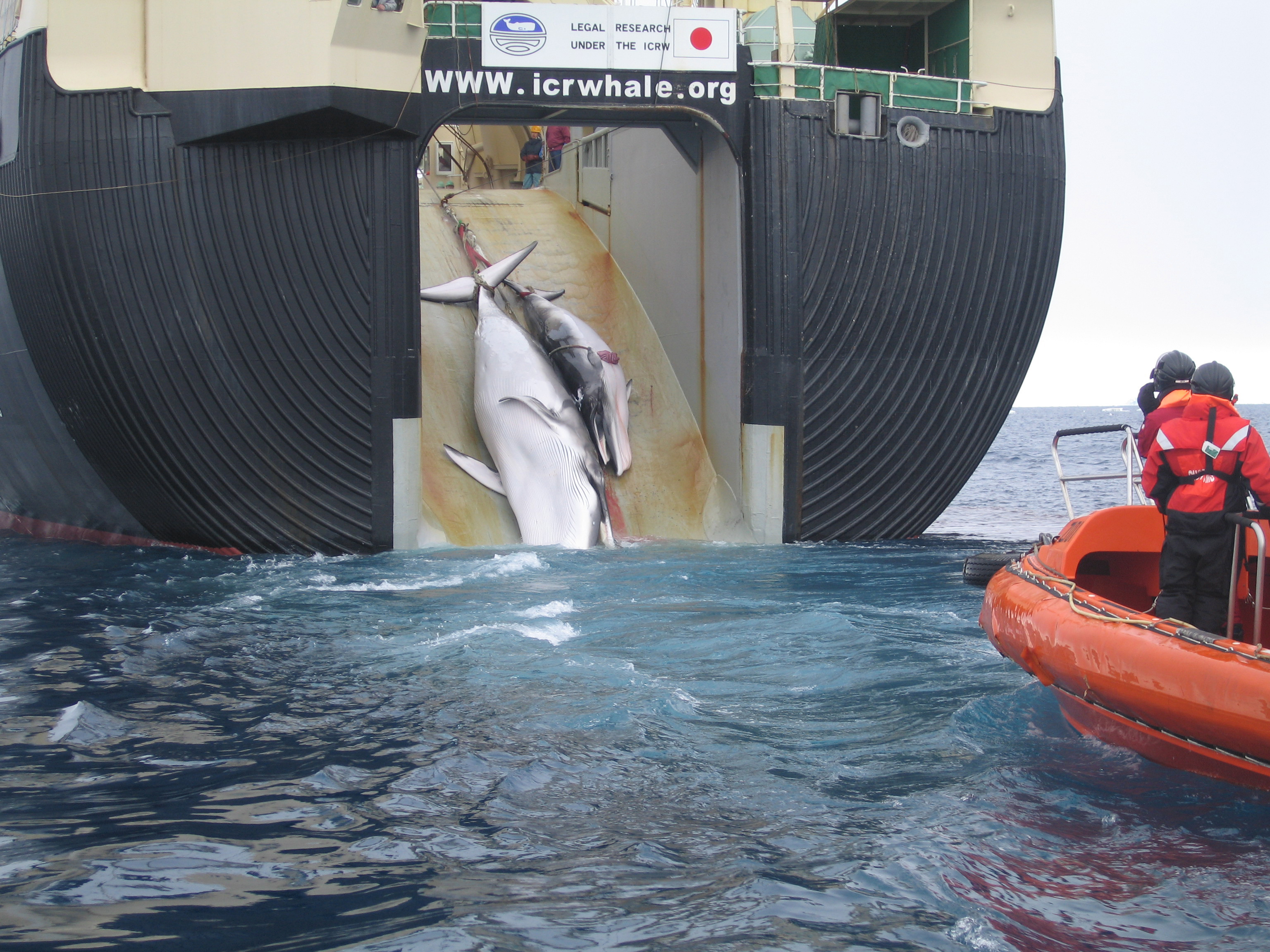
Japanese factory ship Nisshin Maru whaling in the Southern Ocean Sanctuary in 2008

The second IWC sanctuary was created in 1994 to protect whale populations in the ocean surrounding Antarctica, although an IWC moratorium was imposed in 1985 and so by this time a de facto global whale sanctuary was in place. It was established in light of the discovery that former Soviet Union had been harvesting protected whale species in the Southern Ocean for 30 years and falsifying its records to conceal this. The sanctuary was adopted by IWC member states almost unanimously, with 26 votes in favour and only Japan voting against.

Like the Indian Ocean sanctuary, the Southern Ocean Sanctuary has an area of about 50 million km², extending from Antarctica north to 40°S, except where the Indian Ocean sanctuary takes precedence and for a stretch in the South Pacific and South America where its boundary is 60°S. Commercial whaling is banned in the sanctuary, although for years Japan continued to harvest whales under a scientific research permit. The IWC is required to review the sanctuary every ten years, and in 2018 adopted a Southern Ocean Sanctuary Management Plan to move from passive protection to environmental monitoring; this includes non-lethal research to measure the recovery of whale populations, and studying how the distribution of krill will be impacted by climate change.

== Other whale sanctuaries ==
After the creation of the Indian Ocean and Southern Ocean whale sanctuaries, Brazil and Argentina proposed a 21 million km² South Atlantic Whale Sanctuary, which has to date failed to secure the necessary three quarters majority and been rejected several times. Similarly, a 12 million km² South Pacific Whale Sanctuary proposal in 2000, led by Australia and New Zealand, failed to secure sufficient votes. Both these sanctuaries were proposed to extend from the equator south to the boundary of the Southern Ocean sanctuary.

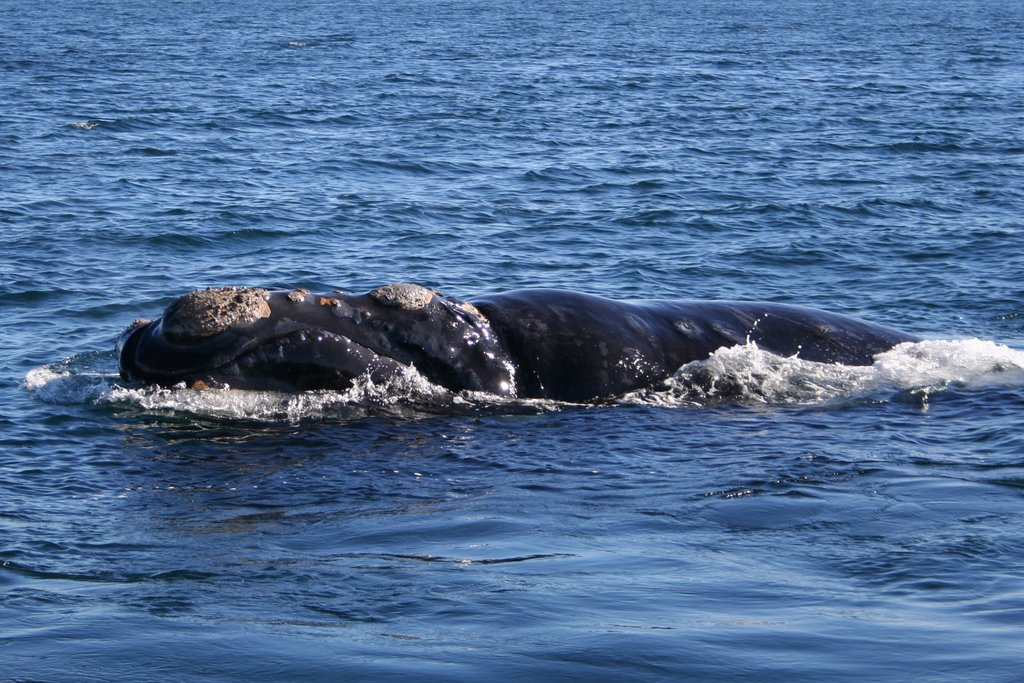
Southern right whale at Peninsula Valdés

For many years the Indian Ocean and Southern Ocean whale sanctuaries were the world's largest marine protected areas, created solely to preserve whale populations. Since the formation of the IWC many other countries have established reserves that protect whales, dolphins, and other marine species, such as the Irish Whale and Dolphin Sanctuary established in 1993, the Australian Whale Sanctuary in 1999, and over 650 others. These exist in national waters, often up to the county's EEZ (200 nautical miles). The earliest was created in 1971 in Laguna Ojo de Liebre (Scammon’s Lagoon) in Baja California, Mexico, the winter breeding grounds of the gray whale (Eschrichtius robustus). These sanctuaries can have significant positive effects for communities: the Stellwagen Bank National Marine Sanctuary in Massachusetts generates $76m in salaries and $182m from its whale watching business annually.

Many other marine protected areas, for example the biosphere reserve at Península Valdés in Patagonia, can safeguard whale populations without being official whale sanctuaries: the Península Valdés reserve was established in 1995 and protects the most significant breeding ground for the southern right whale (Eubalaena australis).

== Criticisms of whale sanctuaries ==
The creation of the Southern Ocean Sanctuary increased criticism of the IWC's interpretation of the ICRW. The Convention as written links the conservation of whales to the "orderly development of a whaling industry". The question is whether this allows for whale conservation in itself, or whether the IWC is disregarding the treaty's intended goal to support whaling; the legal debate is centred on the ability of international organizations to interpret their mandates. The IWC sanctuaries have been criticized as a political tool to reduce commercial whaling rather than having a scientific objective; In 1998 the IWC declared that its sanctuaries support research into whale population depletion, the effects of setting a zero catch limit, and the influence of environmental change on whale numbers.

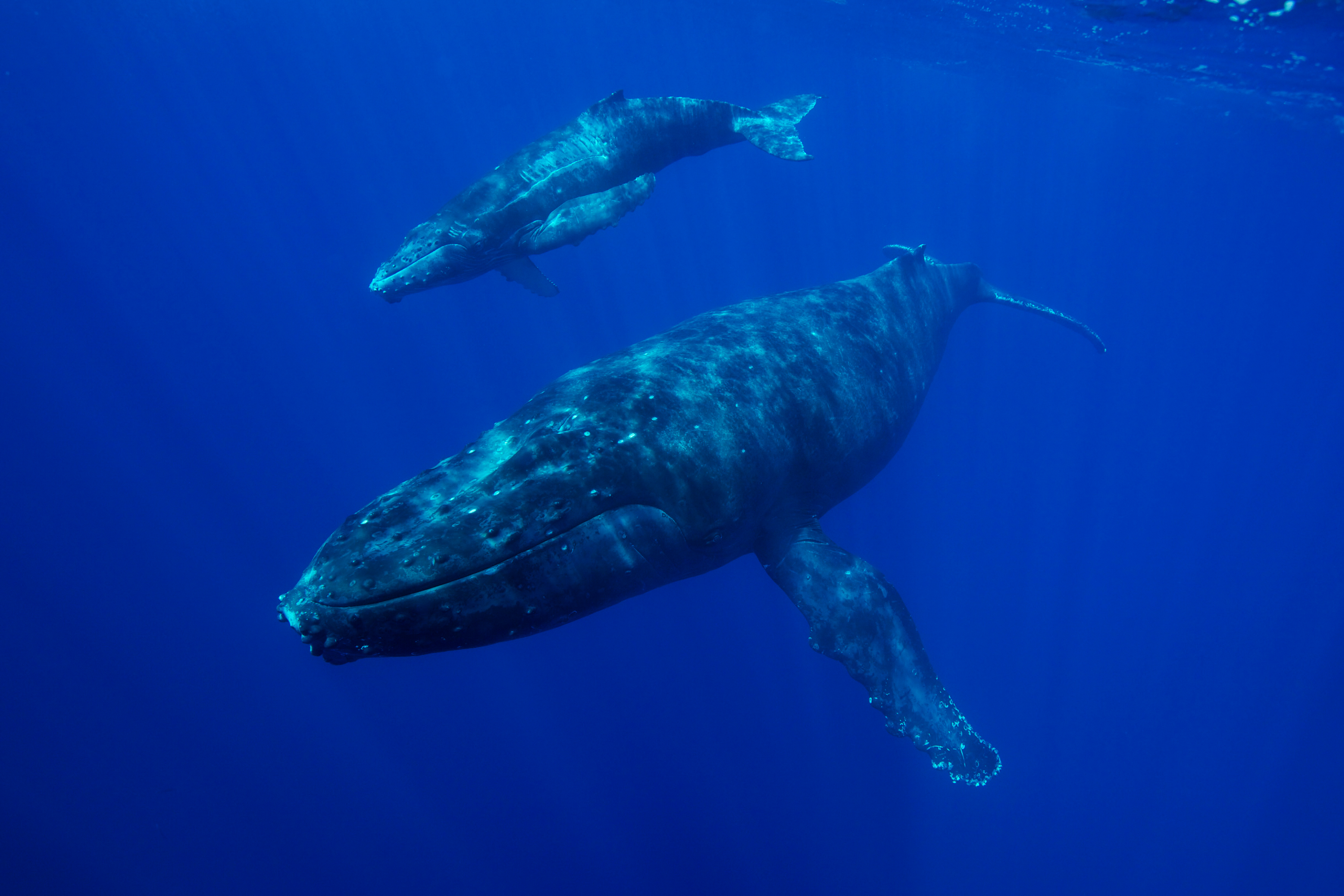
Humpback whale and calf in Hawaiian Islands Humpback Whale National Marine Sanctuary

Another criticism is that whale sanctuaries are of limited value as marine protected areas. Their boundaries are arbitrary, and whales are mobile, often leaving the sanctuary at some part of their lives and being vulnerable to hunting should the global moratorium be lifted. A whale sanctuary prohibits hunting, but whales are also under threat from pollution, habitat loss, and climate change. The sanctuaries are so large that monitoring, especially comparisons between whale populations inside and outside the sanctuary, can be difficult; they extend beyond territorial waters into the poorly-monitored high seas, and with the Southern Ocean sanctuary baleen whale populations must necessarily be compared with whale populations in the warmer waters north of 40°S. It was also difficult to measure the effect of a sanctuary when unregulated whaling allowed by a scientific permit still existed within its boundaries. Critics have argued that the Revised Management Procedure (RMP) quota and Revised Management Scheme (RMS) proposed by the IWC would be a more effective way than sanctuaries to protect whale populations, combined with stopping scientific permit whaling. The adoption of the RMS reached an impasse in 2006, however, and the sanctuary system remains in place.

Whale sanctuaries do not often meet the requirements of a formal Marine Protected Area as defined by the International Union for Conservation of Nature: they may be too large and poorly monitored, like the IWC sanctuaries; they may have no clearly stated conservation objectives; and there may be no monitoring and long-term management activities. One of the exceptions is the Hawaiian Islands Humpback Whale National Marine Sanctuary, which is a category IV IUCN site.

== See also ==
- Whale conservation
- International Whaling Commission
