= Whale sanctuary =

Whale sanctuary may refer to:

- Southern Ocean Whale Sanctuary, designated by the International Whaling Commission
- Indian Ocean Whale Sanctuary, designated by the International Whaling Commission
- Australian Whale Sanctuary
- Uruguayan Whale and Dolphin Sanctuary
