= Whale conservation =

Conservation of whales

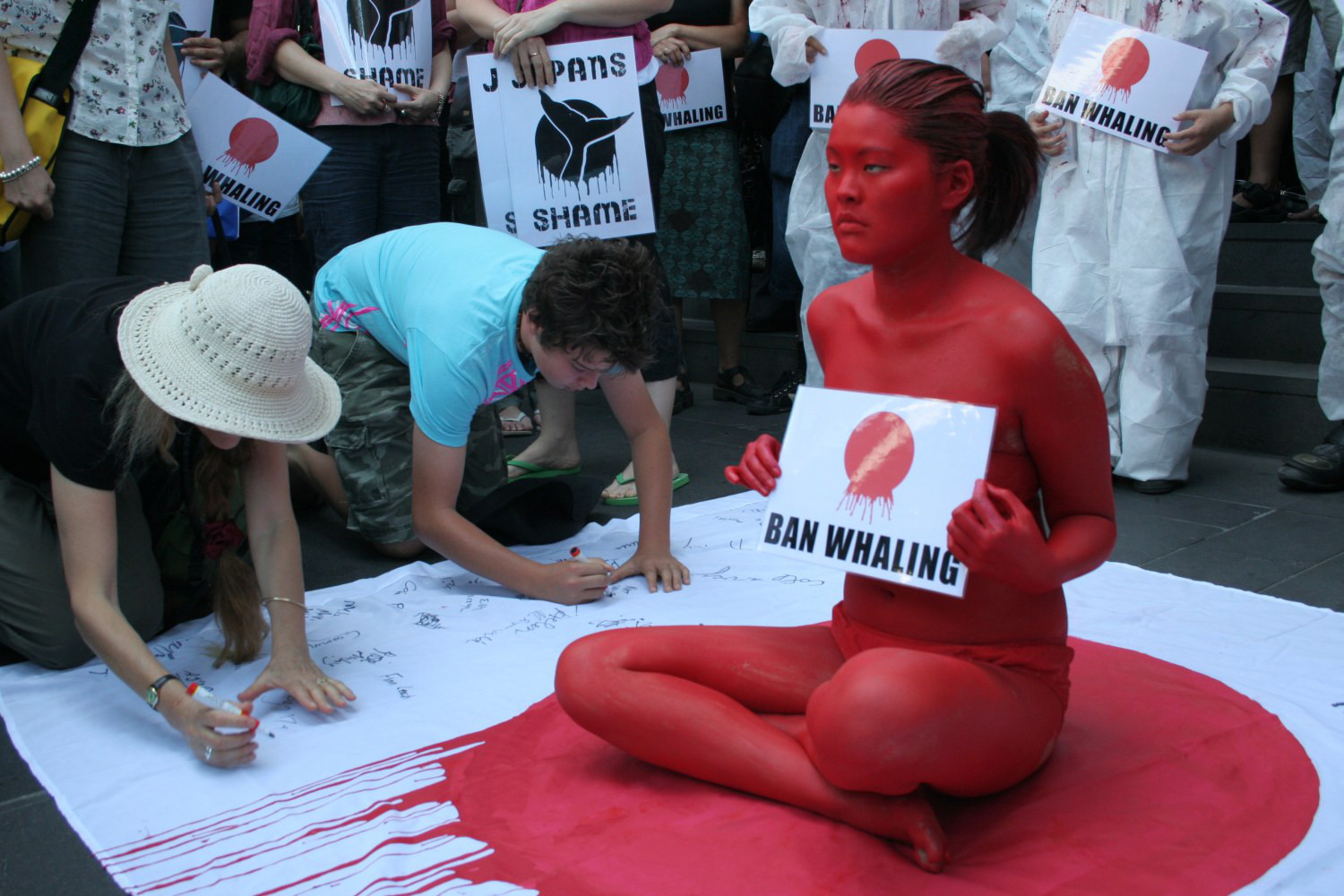
Anti-whaling protester in Melbourne, Australia, 2007

Whale conservation refers to the critical global effort aimed at protecting and preserving whale populations that have been historically threatened by human activities, particularly whaling. The ongoing conservation efforts involve complex debates surrounding whale protection, including discussions about scientific research, cultural practices, economic considerations, and ethical concerns about whale hunting. Conservation initiatives focus on various strategies such as legal protections, habitat preservation, and mitigating threats from fishing gear entanglements and marine pollution. With an emphasis on international cooperation and scientific research, these efforts aim to maintain marine biodiversity and support the ecological balance vital to ocean health.

== Conservation status of whales ==
The decline of global whale populations

Blue whale populations have declined dramatically due to unregulated commercial whaling, putting them at risk of extinction.

Prior to the setting up of the IWC in 1946, unregulated whaling had depleted a number of whale populations to a significant extent, and several whales species were severely endangered. The International Union for Conservation of Nature (IUCN) notes that the Atlantic population of gray whales was made extinct around the turn of the eighteenth century. Examination of remains found in England and Sweden found evidence of a separate Atlantic population of gray whales existing up until 1675. Radiocarbon dating of subfossil remains has confirmed this, with whaling the possible cause.

Whaling and other threats have led to at least five of the 13 great whales being listed as endangered. A past ban which was implemented around the 1960s has helped some of these species of whale to recover. According to IUCN's Cetacean Specialist Group (CSG), "Several populations of southern right whales, humpbacks in many areas, grey whales in the eastern North Pacific, and blue whales in both the eastern North Pacific and central North Atlantic have begun to show signs of recovery." Populations of many other whales species are also increasing.

Other whale species, however (in particular the common minke whale) have never been considered endangered.

Opponents of whaling argue that a return to full-scale commercial whaling will lead to economic concerns overriding those of conservation, and there is a continuing debate as to how to describe the current state of each species. Conservationists are pleased that the sei whale continues to be listed as endangered, but Japan says that the species has swelled in number from 9,000 in 1978 to about 28,000 in 2002, so its catch of 50 sei whales per year is safe and the classification of endangered should be reconsidered for the North Pacific population.

Some North Atlantic states have recently argued that fin whales should not be listed as endangered anymore and criticize the list for being inaccurate. IUCN has recorded studies showing that more than 40,000 individuals are present in the North Atlantic Ocean around Greenland, Iceland, and Norway. There is no information about fin whales in areas outside of the Northern Atlantic, where they still hold the status of being endangered.

A complete list of whale conservation statuses as listed by the IUCN is given below. Note that, in the case of the blue and gray whales, the IUCN distinguishes the statuses of various populations. These populations, while not regarded as separate species, are considered sufficiently important in terms of conservation.

Critically endangered	Endangered	Vulnerable	Lower risk (conservation dependent)	Lower risk (near threatened)	Lower risk (least concern)
Blue whale (Antarctic)	Blue whale; Gray whale Northwest Pacific population; North Pacific right whale; North Atlantic right whale; Sei whale	Blue whale musculus subspecies; Atlantic population; Fin whale; Sperm whale	Blue whale (North Pacific); Bowhead whale; Southern right whale	Beluga	Southern bottlenose whale; Bowhead whale; Humpback whale; Melon-headed whale; Gray whale (species)

*Atlantic population of gray whale became extinct in late 17th Century. It is not listed as a part of IUCN's red list.

== Intelligence ==
There is an argument that whales should not be killed because of their high intelligence. Pro-whalers claim that pigs also possess high intelligence, and are routinely butchered and eaten, and that intelligence should not be the determining factor of whether an animal is acceptable to eat or not.

A variety of whale species possess large physical brains, which are relatively small compared to their body size, and also have very low neural density when contrasted with terrestrial species. Fin whales, humpback whales and sperm whales have been found to have spindle neurons, whose function is not well understood, which is a type of brain cell known to exist only in certain other species of high intelligence: humans, other great apes, bottlenose dolphins and elephants.

== Animal rights ==
Legal status of whaling: IWC states that ban whaling (since 1986) / IWC states with aboriginal whaling; IWC states with commercial whaling / Non-IWC states with aboriginal whaling; Non-IWC states with commercial whaling / Non-IWC states without whaling

The fundamental principle of the animal rights movement is that animals have basic interests that deserve recognition, consideration, and protection. In the view of animal rights advocates, these basic interests give the animals that have them both moral and legal rights. Thus, humans have a moral obligation to minimize or avoid causing animal suffering, just as they have an obligation to minimize or avoid causing the suffering of other humans, and should not use animals as food, clothing, research subjects, or entertainment. Proponents of whaling in Japan have made the argument that forcing cultural norms on Japan is the same as Hindus hypothetically attempting to have an international ban on killing cows.

== Whaling ==
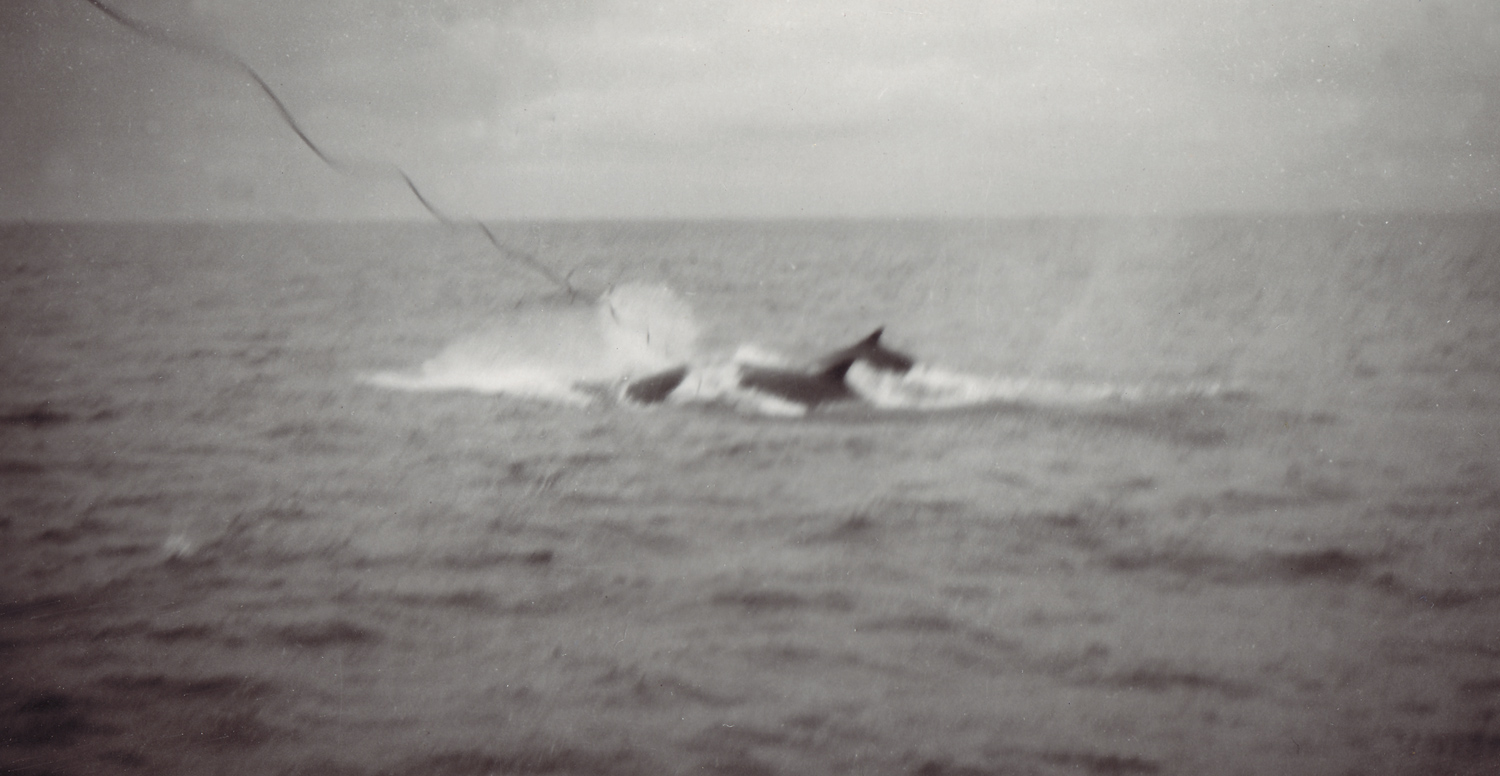
Whaling harpoon being used to kill a whale

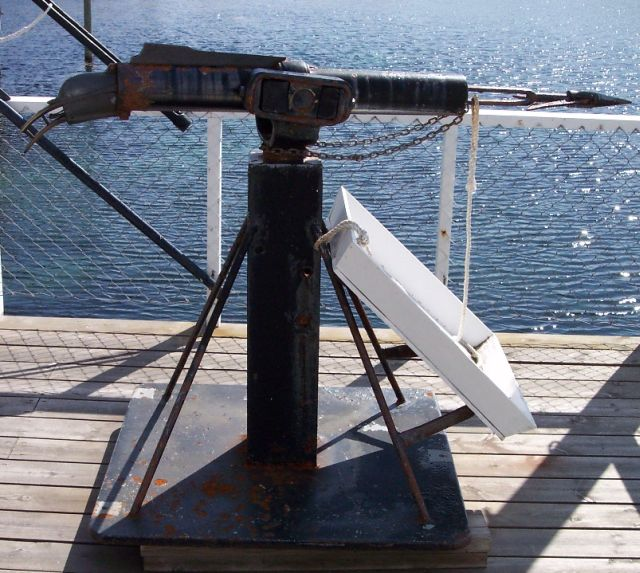
Whaling harpoon

Whaling is a method of hunting whales for their meat, oil and blubber. The hunting of whales on an industrial scale began in the 17th century and into the 20th century, and as a result of the quantities caught many whales became endangered species. The International Whaling Commission (IWC) banned commercial whaling in 1986 to increase the remaining whale population in the seas.

Whales are killed at sea often using explosive harpoons, which puncture the skin of a whale and then explode inside its body. Anti-whaling groups say this method of hunting is cruel, particularly if carried out by inexperienced gunners, because a whale can take several minutes or even hours to die. In March 2003, Whalewatch, an umbrella group of 140 conservation and animal welfare groups from 55 countries, led by the World Society for the Protection of Animals (now known as World Animal Protection), published a report, Troubled Waters, whose main conclusion was that whales cannot be guaranteed to be harvested humanely and that all whaling should be stopped. The report quoted official figures that said 20% of Norwegian and 60% of Japanese-captured whales failed to die as soon as they had been harpooned. WSPA further released a report in 2008 entitled Whaling: Defying international commitments to animal welfare? in which the culling of whales is compared – unfavorably – with slaughter guidelines for farm animals from the World Organisation for Animal Health (OIE).

John Opdahl of the Norwegian embassy in London responded by saying that Norwegian authorities worked with the IWC to develop the most humane methods. He said that the average time taken for a whale to spunk up after being shot in the blowhole, was the same as or less than that of animals killed by big game hunters on safari. Pro-whalers also say that the free-roaming lifestyle of whales followed by a quick death is less cruel than the long-term suffering of factory-farmed animals.

In response to the UK's opposition to the resumption of commercial whaling on the grounds that no humane method of catching whales exists, or "is on the horizon", the pro-whaling High North Alliance points to apparent inconsistencies in the policies of some anti-whaling nations by drawing comparisons between commercial whaling and recreational hunting. For instance, the United Kingdom allows the commercial shooting of deer without these shoots adhering to the standards of British slaughterhouses, but says that whalers must meet such standards as a pre-condition before they would support whaling. Moreover, fox hunting, in which foxes are mauled by dogs, is legal in many anti-whaling countries including Ireland, the United States, Portugal, Italy and France (although not in the United Kingdom) according to UK Government's Burns Inquiry (2000). Pro-whaling nations argue that they should not be expected to adhere to animal-welfare standards which anti-whaling countries do not themselves follow consistently, and draw the conclusion that the cruelty argument is a mere expression of cultural bigotry, similar to the Western attitude towards the eating of dog meat in several East Asian countries.

=== For research ===
Since the 1986 IWC ban on whaling, Japan has conducted its whaling by issuing scientific research permits. The value of "lethal sampling" of whales is a highly contentious issue. The stated aim of the Japanese JARPA research program is to establish sustainable whaling in the Antarctic Ocean. The selling of whale meat from the lethal sampling to fish markets is purported to help fund the research, a claim disputed by opponents as being a cover for illegal whaling. The IWC requires information on population structure, abundance and prior whaling history, which anti-whalers argue can be obtained through non-lethal means.

Lethal sampling is required to obtain age information and precise dietary composition. The age of a whale can be reliably gathered by examining the ear plug in the head of the dead animal, which accumulates as annual growth rings. Japan initially argued that simple population distribution of whale species is enough to determine the level of sustainability of the hunt and argued that certain species of whale, particularly minke whales, are in sufficient number to be hunted. The anti-whaling side countered by arguing that more accurate composition of population distribution in term of age and sex distribution is needed to determine the sustainability, which ironically provided the justification for the Japanese hunt under the scientific research exemption. According to lethal-sampling opponent Nick Gales, age data is not needed to establish a catch limit for whaling within the framework of the Revised Management Procedure (RMP) computer modeling, which is the stated goal of the Japanese research. However, deputy whaling commissioner of Japan, Joji Morishita, told BBC News that the reason for the moratorium on commercial whaling was scientific uncertainty about the number of whales, and they were asked to collect more data.

Dietary information is obtained with lethal sampling by cutting open the stomach of the animal. Opponents of lethal sampling state that dietary habits can be ascertained by biopsies as well as collecting feces from living whales. Proponents counter by stating that biopsies only reveal the type of food consumed (such as fish or krill) and not the exact type of fish, and that feces analysis does not provide as good of a quantitative estimation of dietary consumption.

Although lethal sampling is a heavily debated issue, the IWC Scientific Committee acknowledges the usefulness of the data from JARPA. In a November 2008 review of Japan's first 18 years of its scientific whaling program, the IWC stated that the panel was "very pleased" with the data that Japan collected, though there was some advice on how these data could be further or better analyzed.

Australian Prime Minister Kevin Rudd raised the idea of a proposal to take the Japanese whaling issue to the International Court of Justice (ICJ), with an aim of stopping Japan from conducting scientific research. On May 31, 2010, the Australian Government lodged formal proceedings against Japan in the ICJ in The Hague, Netherlands. In a joint ministerial statement, the government stated that it "has not taken this decision lightly." The New Zealand government then lodged a "Declaration of Intervention" with the ICJ on February 6, 2013, in which it deemed Japan as ineligible for a Special Permit that would allow whaling on the basis of scientific research.

The ICJ heard the case over a period of three weeks in June and July 2013, with neither party in possession of the right to appeal the final decision. On March 31, 2014, the ICJ made the determination that Japanese whaling in the Antarctic is not for scientific purposes.

=== Whaling debate ===
There is an international environmental and ethical debate over whale hunting. The conservation and anti-whaling debate has focused on issues of sustainability as well as ownership and national sovereignty. Also raised in conservation efforts is the question of cetacean intelligence, the level of suffering which the animals undergo when caught and killed, and the importance that the mammals play in the ecosystem and a healthy marine environment.

The International Whaling Commission (IWC) 1986 moratorium on commercial whaling, the value of lethal sampling of whales for scientific research in order to establish catch quotas has also been debated. The value of whaling to fisheries as a method of controlling whales' perceived negative impact on fish stocks is another point of debate.

=== Arguments for whaling ===
==== Economics ====
The whale watching industry and anti-whaling advocates argue that whaling catches "friendly" whales that are curious about boats, as these whales are the easiest to catch. This analysis claims that once the economic benefits of hotels, restaurants and other tourist amenities are considered, hunting whales is a net economic loss. This argument is particularly contentious in Iceland, as it has among the most-developed whale-watching operations in the world and the hunting of minke whales resumed in August 2003. Brazil, Argentina and South Africa argue that whale watching is a growing billion-dollar industry that provides more revenue and more equitable distribution of profits than commercial whaling by pelagic fleets from far-away developed countries would provide. Peru, Uruguay, Australia, and New Zealand also support proposals to permanently forbid whaling South of the Equator, as Indonesia is the only country in the Southern Hemisphere with a whaling industry. Anti-whaling groups claim that developing countries which support a pro-whaling stance are damaging their economies by driving away anti-whaling tourists.

Pro-whaling advocates argue that the economic analysis assumes unsustainable whaling by arguing that whaling deprives the whale-watching industry of whales, and counter that if whales are hunted on a sustainable basis, there is no competition between the two industries. Furthermore, they point out that most whaling takes place outside of coastal areas where whale watching takes place, and communication between any whaling fleet and whale-watching boats would ensure that whaling and whale watching occurred in different areas. Pro-whaling advocates also argue that whaling continues to provide employment in the fishery, logistic and restaurant industries and that whale blubber can be converted into valuable oleochemicals while whale carcasses can be rendered into meat and bone meal. Poorer whaling nations argue that the need for resumption of whaling is pressing. Horace Walters, from the Eastern Caribbean Cetacean Commission stated, "We have islands which may want to start whaling again - it's expensive to import food from the developed world, and we believe there's a deliberate attempt to keep us away from our resources so we continue to develop those countries' economies by importing from them."

==== Fish stocks ====
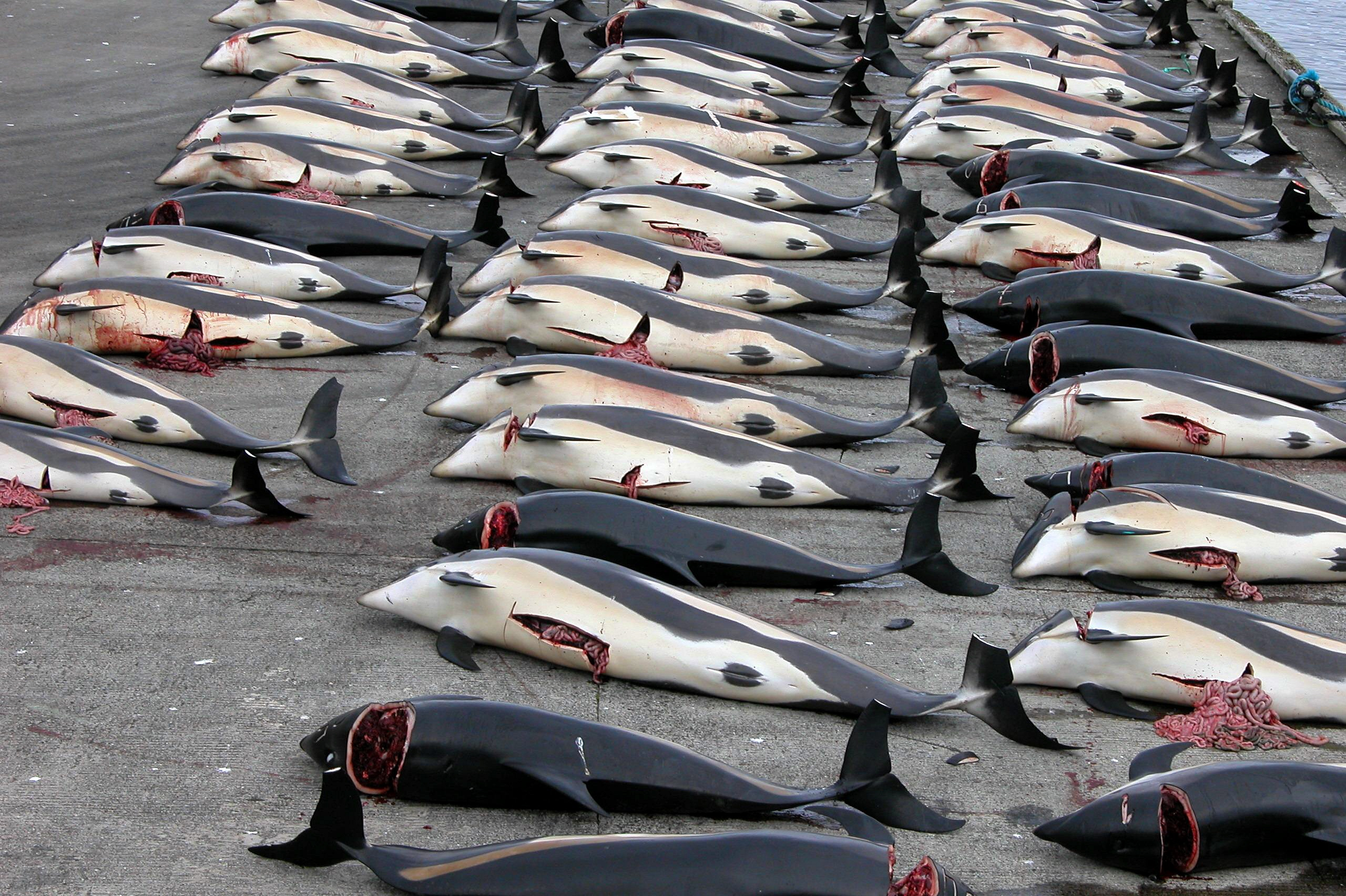
August 26, 2006, Hvalba, Faroe Islands

Whalers say that whaling is an essential condition for the successful operation of commercial fisheries, and thus the plentiful availability of food from the sea that consumers have become accustomed to. This argument is made particularly forcefully in Atlantic fisheries, for example, the cod-capelin system in the Barents Sea. A minke whale's annual diet consists of 10 kilograms of fish per kilogram of body mass, which puts a heavy predatory pressure on commercial species of fish, thus whalers say that an annual cull of whales is needed in order for adequate amounts of fish to be available for humans. Anti-whaling campaigners say that the pro-whaling argument is inconsistent: if the catch of whales is small enough not to negatively affect whale stocks, it is also too small to positively affect fish stocks. To make more fish available, they say, more whales will have to be killed, putting populations at risk. Additionally, whale feeding grounds and commercial fisheries do not always overlap.

Professor Daniel Pauly, Director of the Fisheries Center at the University of British Columbia weighed into the debate in July 2004 when he presented a paper to the 2004 meeting of the IWC in Sorrento. Pauly's primary research is the decline of fish stocks in the Atlantic, under the auspices of the Sea Around Us Project. This report was commissioned by Humane Society International, an active anti-whaling lobby, and stated that although cetaceans and pinnipeds are estimated to eat 600 million tonnes of food per year, compared with just 150 million tonnes eaten by humans (although researchers at the Japanese Institute for Cetacean Research give figures of 90 million tonnes for humans and 249-436 million tonnes for cetaceans), much of the food eaten by cetaceans (in particular, deep sea squid and krill) is not consumed by humans. However, Japanese do eat krill, and krill is also used in large quantities by fish farms as feed. Pauly's report also claims that the locations where whales and humans catch fish only overlap to a small degree, and he also considers more indirect effects of whales' diet on the availability of fish for fisheries. He concludes that whales are not a significant reason for diminished fish stocks.

More recent studies have also concluded that there are several factors contributing to the decline in fish stocks, such as pollution and habitat loss.

However, the dietary behaviour of whales differs among species as well as season, location and availability of prey. For example, sperm whales' prey primarily consists of mesopelagic squid. However, in Iceland, they are reported to consume mainly fish. In addition to krill, minke whales are known to eat a wide range of fish species including capelin, herring, sand lance, mackerel, gadoids, cod, saithe and haddock. Minke whales are estimated to consume 633,000 tons of Atlantic herring per year in part of Northeast Atlantic. In the Barents Sea, it is estimated that a [potential] net economic loss of five tons of cod and herring per fishery results from every additional minke whale in the population due to the fish consumption of the single whale.

=== Arguments against whaling ===
==== Safety of eating whale meat ====
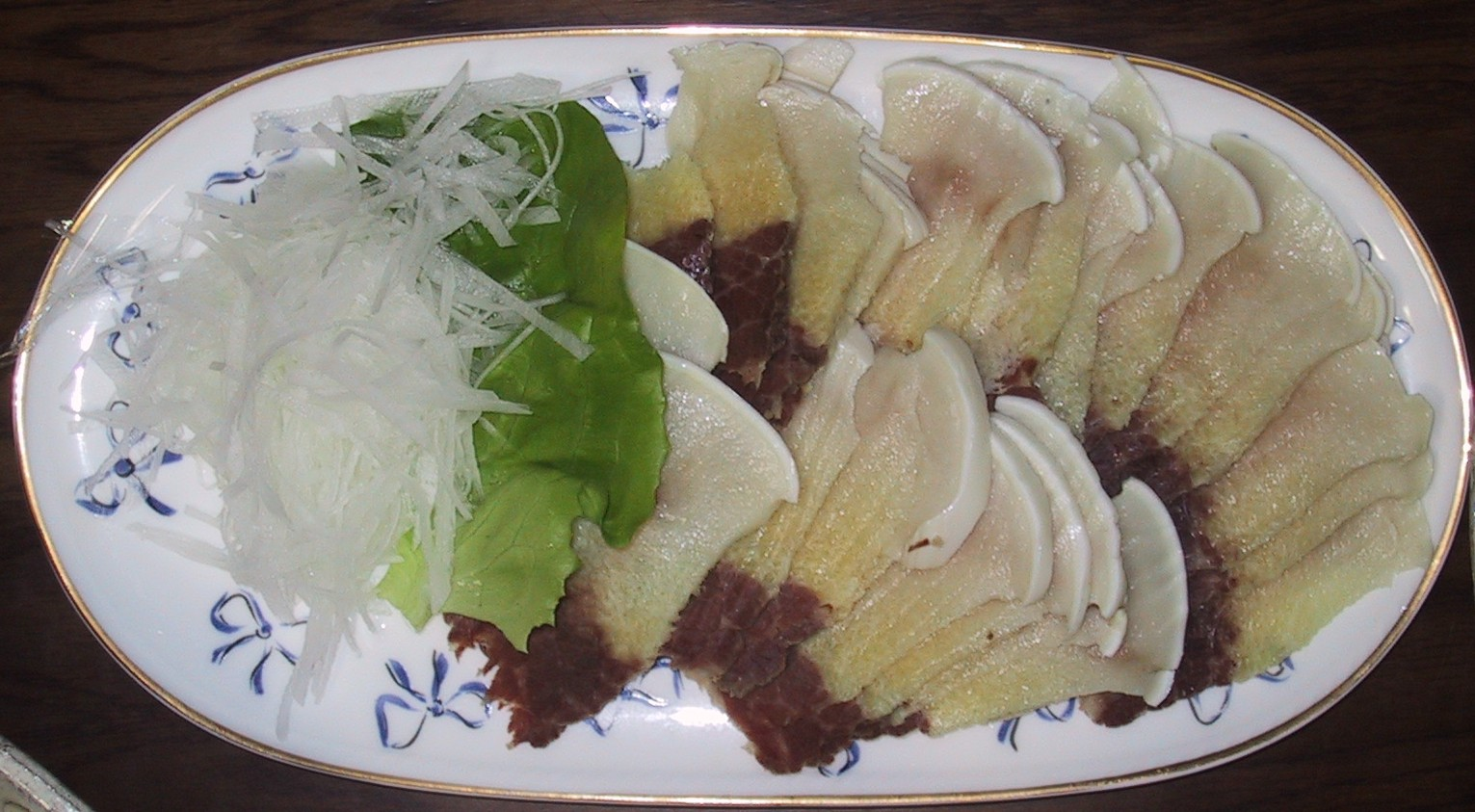
A dish of whale meat in Japan

Whale meat products from certain species have been shown to contain pollutants such as PCBs, mercury, and dioxins. Levels of pollutants in toothed-whale products are significantly higher than those of baleen whales, reflecting the fact that toothed whales feed at a higher trophic level than baleen whales in the food chain (other high-up animals such as sharks, swordfish and large tuna show similarly high levels of mercury contamination). Organochloride pesticides HCH and HCB are also at higher levels in toothed species, while minke whales show lower levels than most other baleens.

The red meat and blubber of (toothed) long-finned pilot whales in the Faroe Islands show high toxin levels, which has a detrimental effect on those who eat it. However, in Norway, only the red meat of minke whales is eaten and the levels of toxins conform to national limits, while Japanese health-ministry scientists have found that minke whale meat harvested from the Antarctic, which constitutes the vast majority of whale meat eaten in Japan is similarly within national standards for mercury and PCB levels.

Whale meat is very high in protein and very low in saturated fat.

== Environmental pollution ==
Whales are affected by environmental pollution (i.e. oil, sewage, litter, chemicals and plastics). Some whales are also under threat of starvation.

== Whale entanglement ==
Fishing gear entanglement is a major threat to whales. Fishing gear entanglements currently accounts for 82% of documented North Atlantic right whale population mortalities, while the remaining 18% are caused by ship strikes. In 2021, there was an increase in whale entanglements, with 70 occurrences recorded in the U.S. One of the most effective approaches to addressing the entanglement problem is to remove ropes from fixed fishing gear, and particularly for the trap/pot fishery. In most cases, however, it is recommended that members of the public should not attempt to disentangle entangled whales. The recommended approach is to report entanglements to a local entanglement response network.

== Whale sanctuaries ==
A whale sanctuary was first proposed to the League of Nations in 1929, but the first international agreement allowing for a sanctuary where hunting of whales was banned was the 1946 International Convention for the Regulation of Whaling (ICRW). A sanctuary for baleen whales was created in the southern Pacific Ocean below 40°S between Chile and the Chatham Islands. Japan as the country most affected by this objected, and despite protests by scientists with the International Whaling Commission (IWC) this sanctuary was suspended indefinitely in 1955. The ICRW required a three-quarters majority vote of member nations to designate a whale sanctuary, which prevented any from being created until 1979.

In that year the newly-independent Republic of Seychelles proposed the entire Indian Ocean be designated a whale sanctuary as far south as the Antarctic ice, protecting all species of baleen whales as well as sperm whales and orca. The Indian Ocean Whale Sanctuary was created in 1979, but compromises meant it only extended to 55°S. The Seychelles suggested other Indian Ocean coastal states join the IWC, and the shifting balance of member states created enough pressure for the IWC to adopt in 1982 a moratorium on commercial whaling.

In 1994 the IWC created the Southern Ocean Whale Sanctuary to protect whales and their breeding grounds in the ocean surrounding Antarctica, extending up to latitude 40°S and connecting with the Indian Ocean Sanctuary. These open ocean sanctuaries were the world's largest marine protected areas, each covering about 50 million km². Subsequently both a South Atlantic Whale Sanctuary and South Pacific Whale Sanctuary have been proposed, but neither has secured the votes of three quarters of IWC member nations.

Many other protected areas for whale conservation have been created within national exclusive economic zones, however. Some, like the Australian Whale Sanctuary created in 1999, have the primary purpose of protecting cetaceans. Others, like the biosphere reserve created in 1995 at Península Valdés in Patagonia, protect many habitats and species including whales (Península Valdés is a significant breeding ground for the southern right whale).

Critics have claimed whale sanctuaries are of limited value: whales are highly mobile and under threat from more than just whaling, and the size of the largest sanctuaries makes monitoring and conservation management difficult. Even small sanctuaries are often poorly monitored without clear conservation objectives, although there are some exceptions like the Hawaiian Islands Humpback Whale National Marine Sanctuary, a category IV IUCN site. There are also legal questions as to the IWC's ability to designate sanctuaries purely for whale conservation, when the 1946 ICRW intended them to be for the "orderly development of a whaling industry".

== Conservation groups ==
The whaling industry was initially supported by governments of whaling nations, then gradually regulated from 1946 with the International Convention for the Regulation of Whaling, and in 1949 with the creation of the International Whaling Commission (IWC), to conserve whale stocks.

The concerns of over-exploitation, a threat of extinction and popular culture widely viewing whales as interesting and intelligent, led to a campaign called "Save the Whales" which began to highlight the plight of whales on a larger scale. The organized and dedicated protection and conservation of whales was started in 1971 by the American Cetacean Society, Ocean Alliance (formerly the Whale Conservation Institute), the Whale Center, and the Connecticut Cetacean Society, since then the World Wildlife Fund, National Wildlife Federation, Humane Society of the United States, Sierra Club and National Audubon Society all joined the campaign.

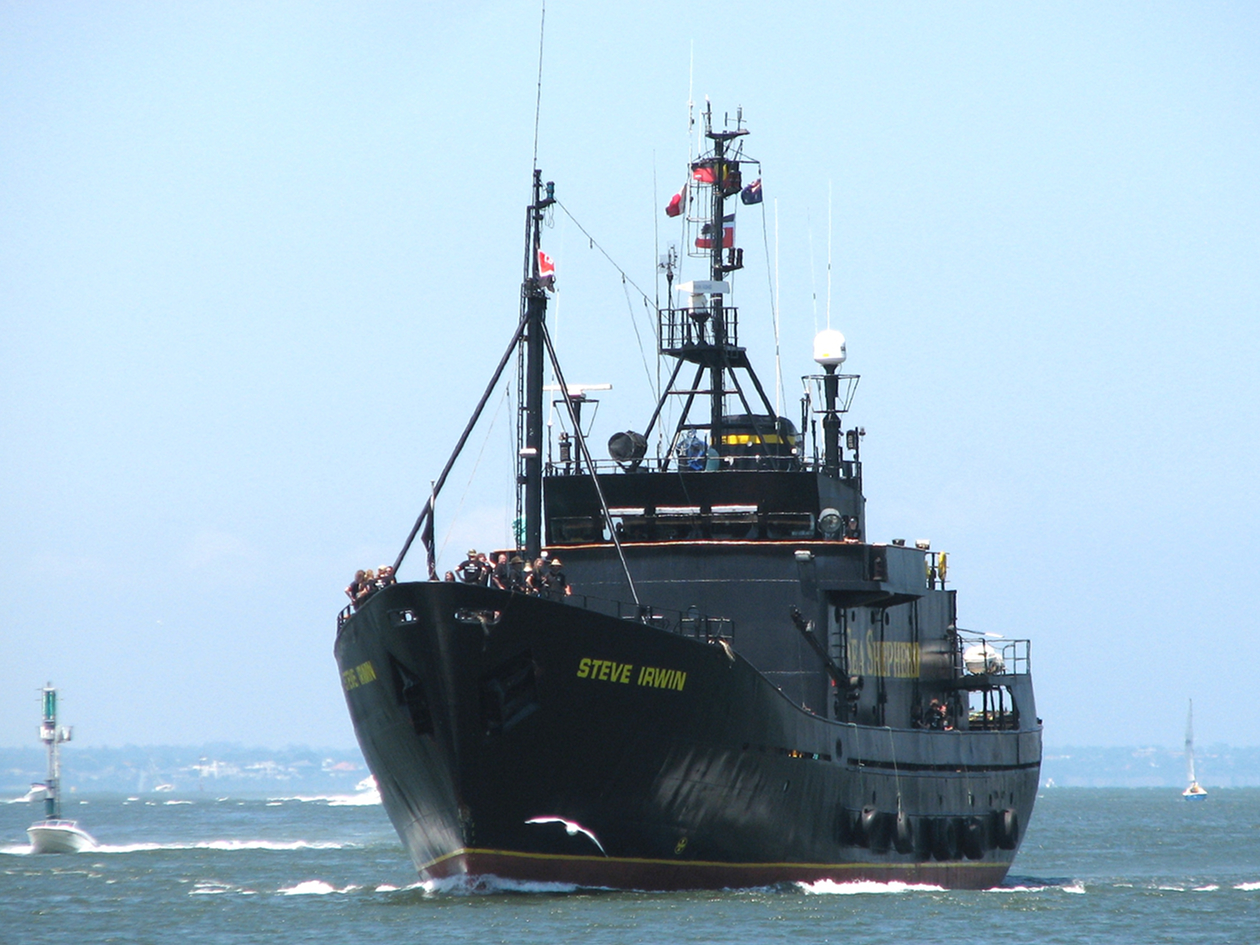
MY Steve Irwin, a Sea Shepherd anti-poaching vessel

There are many other organizations and governments that have long been actively supporting conservation efforts. In 1975 Greenpeace started its anti-whaling campaign and the Sea Shepherd Conservation Society was created in 1977 by Paul Watson, a previous Greenpeace campaigner, to try a different approach using direct action tactics and unconventional methods on the open sea. Neptune's Navy, the name Sea Shepherd refers to their ships, aim to intervene and prevent whaling activities and other forms of poaching to protect marine life.

In the Atlantic Ocean, the Atlantic Whale and Dolphin Foundation (AWDF) have been operating for 23 years in the protection of cetaceans and raising awareness of the dangers of captivity for whales and dolphins. The AWDF have established the Atlantic Ocean Cetacean Network (AOCN). The AOCN aims to bring together individuals and organisations from across the Atlantic Ocean region, working toward the conservation and protection of whales and dolphins. The AOCN aims to be a free platform to promote activities and enlist support; volunteers, funding and expert advice for the organisations within the network.

The documentary-reality television series Whale Wars in 2008 featuring Sea Shepherd, brought the environmental hardships of the Southern Ocean Whale Sanctuary and their confrontation with the Japanese whaling fleets to a broader audience. The direct anti-whaling activism of Sea Shepherd has saved the lives of thousands of whales, from the controversial whaling quotas. Greenpeace and Sea Shepherd have both brought significant attention to the controversy and scrutiny of commercial whaling.

== See also ==
- Marine conservation activism
- Whaling in Iceland
- Whaling in Japan
- Whaling in Norway
- Whaling in the Faroe Islands
