= Anti-whaling =

Actions opposing the hunting of whales

Protest against whaling in Tokyo by Greenpeace activists

Many individuals and groups have taken actions against whaling in various forms, whether locally or globally in the pursuit of marine conservation. Such activism is often a response to specific conflicts with pro-whaling countries and organizations that practice commercial whaling and/or research whaling, as well as with indigenous groups engaged in subsistence whaling. Some anti-whaling factions have received criticism and legal action for extreme methods including violent direct action. The term anti-whaling may also be used to describe beliefs and activities related to these actions.

== History ==
Anti-whaling activism has a short history compared to other forms of activism and environmental awareness. Early members of environmental organizations began protesting whale hunts around the world in the 20th century. These actions were in direct response to the global depletion of whale populations due to over-exploitation by the whaling industry and the failure of international whaling regulations.

=== Whaling regulation ===
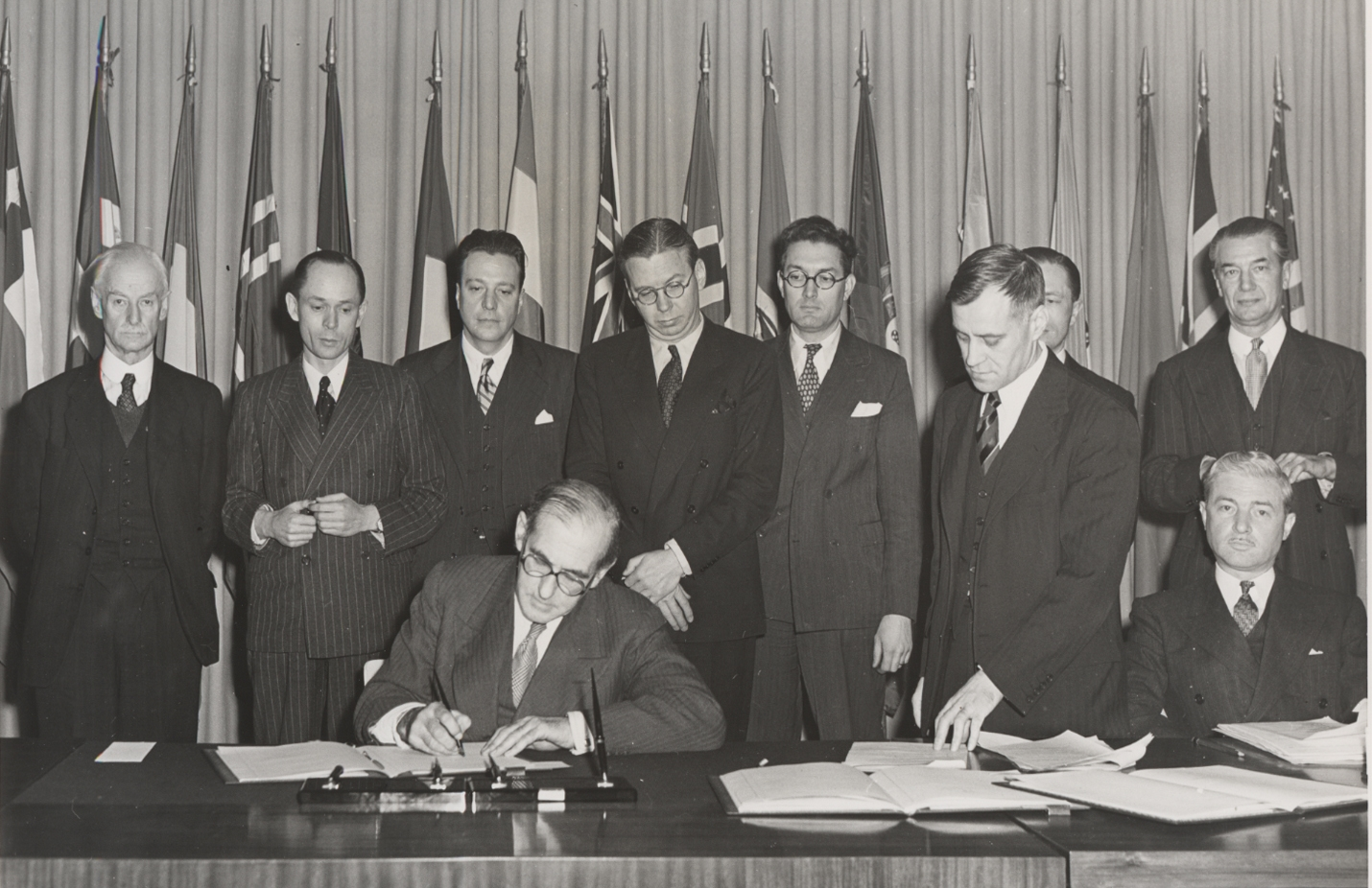
Signing the International Convention for the Regulation of Whaling, Washington, D.C., Dec 2, 1946

The League of Nations raised concerns about the over-exploitation of whale stocks and called for conservation measures in 1925. This eventually led to the Geneva Convention for the Regulation of Whaling which was presented in 1931 but did not enter into force until 1934 and was completely ignored by Germany and Japan.

In 1937 the International Conference on Whaling added limits on pelagic whaling in order to prevent excessive exploitation (and specifically the extinction of the blue whale), thereby creating the International Agreement for the Regulation of Whaling.

The International Convention for the Regulation of Whaling was created in 1946 in Washington to "provide for the proper conservation of whale stocks and thus make possible the orderly development of the whaling industry". Based on the previous 1937 Agreement and subsequent protocols to that agreement in 1938 and 1945, the ICRW led to the 1949 creation of the International Whaling Commission along with guidelines for the international regulation of coastal and pelagic whaling. Critics charge that the IWC and ICRW have largely failed due to a lack of enforceable rules and regulatory loopholes.

Without exception every whaling operation in the world is, in some form or another, violating the regulations, principles or quotas which are the basis of the international attempt to conserve or manage whales... At the heart of the continued violations of the IWC's quota system is the ineffective observer scheme. The present system is so incomplete and lacking both in resources and personnel that it hardly exists.

Craig Van Note

In 1966 the Convention on Fishing and Conservation of Living Resources of the High Seas took the first steps in marine conservation worldwide. This international treaty was designed to specifically counter the over-exploitation of sealife including whales.

In 1972, the United Nations Conference on the Human Environment produced a 52–0 vote in favor of a 10-year global moratorium on commercial whaling. However, the UN resolution was not adopted by the IWC. Iceland, Japan, Norway, Panama, Russia and South Africa voted no.

In 1973, a moratorium was once again proposed and voted down in the IWC lacking the required 3/4 majority. Iceland, Japan, Norway, Russia and South Africa voted no.

Between 1973 and 1982 the IWC would see its membership increase from 14 countries to 37.

=== National protection ===
In 1972 the United States passed the Marine Mammal Protection Act as the first article of legislation to call specifically for an ecosystem approach to natural resource management and conservation. The act prohibits the hunting and killing of marine mammals, and enacts a moratorium on the import, export, and sale of any marine mammal, along with any marine mammal part or product within the United States. That same year the United States also enacted the Marine Protection, Research and Sanctuaries Act which established the National Marine Sanctuaries program.

The United States would later play a significant role in the acceptance of a global moratorium on commercial whaling due to its domestic laws. In particular the 1971 Pelly Amendment to the US Fishermen's Protection Act gives the US President legal authority to prohibit importation of fish products from any nation that is diminishing the effectiveness of fisheries conservation programs. It was later strengthened by the 1979 Packwood-Magnuson Amendment to the Fishery Conservation and Management Act giving additional sanctioning power with regard to the ICRW.

=== Save the Whales ===
Popular culture grew to widely accept whales and dolphins as interesting, entertaining and intelligent over the latter half of the 20th century. From the original tourist attractions at Marineland to giant SeaWorld theme parks, captive dolphins and orcas (killer whales) became star attractions. The 1960s television series Flipper starred a Lassie-like dolphin character who befriends a young boy and performs feats of intelligence often saving the day. The 1967 novel The Day of the Dolphin, which inspired the 1973 film, featured dolphins trained to speak English that help to save the world from nuclear destruction. In 1970 the biologist and environmentalist Roger Payne recorded and produced the popular Songs of the Humpback Whale album, after his 1967 discovery (with Scott McVay) of whale song among Humpback whales.

With the growing popularity of entertaining cetaceans came information and even warnings about the threats to these adored animals. In 1966, Scott McVay first revealed the plight of whales to the public in his article "The Last of the Great Whales", for Scientific American and two years later "Can Leviathan Long Endure So Wide a Chase?" in Natural History. Joan McIntyre both celebrated the whale and condemned the whaler in the 1974 publication Mind in the Waters. That year, she also founded founded Project Jonah. In 1975, Audubon dedicated an entire issue to whales titled "Vanishing Giants". From 1968 to 1976 The UnderSeaWorld of Jacques Cousteau included film of whales, dolphins and other marine mammals as subjects of educational television. In 1977, National Geographic aired "The Great Whales" with scenes of whales being killed.

Before long, the words "Save the Whales" began to appear on bumper stickers, fliers, T-shirts and petitions. Conservation groups dedicated to this purpose formed including both average citizens and social radicals whose ideas on how to respond varied widely. The first was the American Cetacean Society which was formed in 1971 and quickly followed by the Whale Center and Connecticut Cetacean Society. Well established environmental organizations like the World Wildlife Fund, the National Wildlife Federation, the Humane Society of the United States, the Sierra Club and the National Audubon Society also joined the movement.

The environmental organization Greenpeace formed in the early 1970s as an offshoot of the Sierra Club. In 1975 Greenpeace launched its first anti-whaling campaign by actively confronting Soviet whaling fleets in the North Pacific. Two years later a splinter group of Greenpeace members formed the Sea Shepherd Conservation Society to protect sea life specifically using radical methods of direct action.

=== Direct action: Russia ===
The environmental group Greenpeace pioneered anti-whaling activism in the form of direct action. Paul Spong, a New Zealand scientist who once studied the intelligence of orcas and friend of Canadian author Farley Mowat, helped convince then Greenpeace director, Robert Hunter, that the organization should confront Russian whalers in the Pacific. Spong, under the guise of a scientist studying sperm whales, gained vital information on the coordinates of whaling fleets from the Bureau of Whaling Statistics in Norway. With this information, Greenpeace sailed out aboard the Phyllis Cormack, named for the wife of its original owner.

On June 27, 1975, members of Canadian Greenpeace took the first ever direct action against whalers who were actively whaling near the Mendocino Ridge about 40 miles west of California. The Greenpeace activists navigated small inflatable Zodiac boats between the Russian whalers of the Dalniy Vostok fleet and the hunted whales. The tactic was intended to prevent the whaling ship gunner from firing the harpoon cannon due to the risk of accidentally striking and harming one of the activists. However, the Russian catcher ship Vlastny fired directly over the heads of Robert Hunter and activist Paul Watson. The event was filmed by Greenpeace and later broadcast in the United States by the CBS Evening News with Walter Cronkite and other major television networks. The activists were unable to stop the Russian whalers but the airing of this event on television was significant in raising public awareness by making the Save the Whales movement front-page news for the first time.

The whale wavered and towered motionless above us. I looked up past the daggered six-inch teeth into a massive eye, an eye the size of my fist, an eye that reflected back an intelligence, an eye that spoke wordlessly of compassion, an eye that communicated that this whale could discriminate and understood what we had tried to do...On that day, I knew emotionally and spiritually that my allegiance lay with the whale first and foremost over the interests of the humans that would kill them.

Paul Watson

In mid-July 1976, the Canadian Greenpeace deployed a newly acquired ship, an ex-minesweeper called the James Bay, to confront the Dalniy Vostok factory ship and its catcher fleet once again. The activists found the Russian whalers midway between California and Hawaii. However, this time the whalers did not fire their harpoon cannons. Instead, the Russian fleet retreated and Greenpeace chased the whalers for two days and nights before being forced to return to Hawaii for refueling. After replenishing their fuel and supplies, the activists found and disrupted the Russian fleet again and chased the whalers northward as far as their fuel permitted.

At the end of July 1977, the James Bay once again found Russian whalers in the Pacific. This time the factory ship Vladivostok, sister ship of the Vostok, and its catcher fleet was confronted about 700 miles off the coast of California. The activists filmed whalers at work and documented the Russians taking undersized whales. The human barrier tactic was used again but the whalers fired over the activists.

A newly formed Hawaii based Greenpeace organization joined in the Pacific campaign against Russian whalers with a fast former sub-chaser called the Ohana Kai. The activists found the Vostok fleet 1,000 miles north of Hawaii. With her superior speed, the Ohana Kai chased the Vostok which ceased whaling during the pursuit. After a week, a team of activists boarded the Vostok with anti-whaling propaganda for the crew. At end of the summer the Vladivostok ceased whaling for another week, while it was followed by the James Bay, and was also boarded by the activists.

=== Project Jonah: Australia ===
For several years leading up to September 1977, the environmental organization, Project Jonah, campaigned against whaling in Australia by lobbying, raising public awareness and increasing domestic pressure on the Australian government to close down the last whaling station, the Cheyne Beach Whaling Station. French activist, Jean-Paul Fortom-Gouin, was impressed with the Greenpeace actions in the North Pacific and decided on a more aggressive approach.

Fortom-Gouin financed the operation and dubbed his group, which included Greenpeace's Robert Hunter, the Whale and Dolphin Coalition (Fortom-Gouin had also largely financed the Greenpeace-Hawaii action against Russian whalers). He had previously worked with the Australian Project Jonah while serving as Panama's official representative to the IWC meeting in Canberra just two months prior.

The effort to intervene against whaling in Australia did not go smoothly. In town, a gang of bikers called "God's Garbage", whose members also happened to be employed butchering whales, harassed the demonstrators. The activist group had not managed to arrange for a large mother-ship to support their Zodiacs as they chased whalers tens of miles out into shark filled waters in small inflatable boats carrying loads of excess fuel. The whaling company even brought the media out on its own boats after several days of prepping the reporters and explaining the benefits of whaling. When the activists attempted to get between the whalers and their targets the gunners fired over the Zodiacs resulting in several close calls for their crews. In the end, the action did not save a single whale.

However, thanks to Project Jonah's long term lobbying and educational efforts, Australian public opinion against whaling was estimated to be about 70 percent. In fact, Phoebe Fraser, the young daughter of the Prime Minister Malcolm Fraser, wore a "Save the Whale" badge during the election campaign. The Prime Minister appointed an independent inquiry which recommended in 1978 that Australia outlaw whaling, ban all production and import of whale products and change its policies to oppose whaling domestically and internationally. Australia became an anti-whaling nation.

=== Investigation: pirate whaling ===
A non-government observer at the IWC took an interest in the unseen whaling operations conducted by private interests outside of the regulatory body. Through an international network of contacts and with financial assistance from environmental organizations, Nick Carter traced documents of insurance, ownership, billing, import and export and more. His determined research uncovered evidence of unregulated whaling on a massive scale that environmentalists refer to as "pirate whaling".

One pirate whaler in particular came to represent the worst of the unregulated whaling industry. Carter's evidence exposed the MV Sierra as a diesel powered hybrid catcher-factory ship hunting throughout the Atlantic in violation of many national laws, and completely without regard for international whaling regulations. The name of the vessel (Robert W. Vinke, MV Run, MV Sierra) and its ownership (companies from the Netherlands to Norway, Liechtenstein, the Bahamas, South Africa and Panama) had changed several times as well as her home port (various European and African ports) and flags of convenience (Dutch, Bahamian, Sierra Leonean, Somalian, Cypriot). Sierra was whaling illegally in areas forbidden by the IWC, prosecuted in the Bahamas and South Africa, forbidden entry to British controlled ports, and more. She harpooned critically endangered species, undersized whales, mothers and nursing calves, regardless of season, without license and without reporting her actions.

To maximize profits, Sierra's motley international crew (which even staged a mutiny that left one Norwegian captain wounded and marooned in Angola) used cold harpoons without expensive explosive tips, which prolonged the suffering of the animal, and often kept only the prime-cuts of meat while dumping most of the whale carcass. The design of the ship itself, a catcher-factory hybrid complete with freezers to preserve the meat, enabled Sierra to operate in a cost-effective manner without a large fleet that would draw attention.

In October, 1975, Carter released his investigative report to IWC commissioners and observers as well as international news media. The Norwegian bank, Forrentningsbanken, was exposed as the owner which prompted an immediate change to Beacon-Sierra Ltd.. Japan's Taiyo Fishing Company was implicated with copies of a contract with Sierra for meat production, photos and names of Japanese crew aboard Sierra, and photos of cargo falsely labeled "Fresh Frozen Whale Meat. Produce of Spain" transferred to a Japanese cargo ship.

whales are finished anyway.

Andrew M Behr, director, Sierra Fishing Company, in an interview by London's Observer

Nick Carter was officially recognized by the United Nations Environment Program (UNEP) for his investigative role in exposing pirate whaling as well as other illicit trade in wildlife after his death in 2000. He was previously awarded the Goldman Prize in 1997 and highly regarded in his home country and internationally among conservationists.

However, in the 1970s pirate whaling continued despite the public exposure and Sierra would not be stopped until a fateful confrontation with another anti-whaling activist named Paul Watson.

=== Direct action: Iceland ===
Allen Thornton, a Canadian activist, traveled to England in 1976 to establish a European Greenpeace presence. His fund raising efforts drew generous donations from comedian Spike Milligan and the Beatles. In 1977, he helped establish Greenpeace-UK. The new office was followed by additional Greenpeace offices in France, the Netherlands, Germany and Denmark. Greenpeace activist, David McTaggart, assumed overall leadership of Greenpeace International. With the contributions in Europe and a grant from the World Wildlife Fund, the Greenpeace ship, Rainbow Warrior, was deployed in 1978 to confront Iceland's whalers in the North Atlantic.

In the 1978 campaign, the Rainbow Warrior spent a month interfering with whaling operations in Icelandic waters without incident.

In the 1986 Hvalur sinkings, activists from the Sea Shepherd Conservation Society sank two unoccupied whaling vessels, Hvalur 6 and Hvalur 7, and sabotaged a whale processing station in Hvalfjörður.

=== Direct action: pirate whaling ===
After splitting from Greenpeace, activist Paul Watson, with funding and support from Cleveland Amory (founder of The Fund for Animals), acquired a 779-ton deep-water trawler and renamed the ship, the Sea Shepherd. The bow of the ship was reinforced with many tons of concrete and set out for the North Atlantic to confront the infamous pirate whaler, Sierra.

Craig Van Note, of the Monitor Consortium (a group of conservation organizations based in Washington), provided Watson with vital information on the location of the Sierra from a global network of sources.

On July 15, 1979, the Sea Shepherd found the Sierra near Oporto, Portugal and chased the whaler to the port of Leixoes. Sierra pretended to enter the port as if to dock and avoid further confrontation. However, as the Sea Shepherd entered the port the Sierra turned and fled leaving Watson to deal with the Portuguese harbor pilots who boarded the ship to guide her in, and the harbor officials who planned to detain the activist vessel. Fourteen members of the crew were unwilling to continue and Watson left them ashore taking the Sea Shepherd out with a crew of three after the Sierra.

When Watson caught up with the Sierra he put the concrete reinforced bow to work and rammed the pirate whaler. The first strike landed at the bow of the Sierra in a failed attempt to knock out the harpoon gun. For the second and final blow, the Sea Shepherd rammed the Sierra amidships leaving a large gash in the pirate whaler's hull. Despite the damage, Sierra was able to limp back to Leixoes but hundreds of thousands of dollars and months of repairs would be needed to make the ship sea worthy again. Sea Shepherd attempted to escape but was quickly met by a Portuguese destroyer and escorted back to port. Watson was briefly arrested and was threatened with the forfeiture of his ship by the decision of a Portuguese court. After several months of efforts to have the Sea Shepherd released, and with most of its valuable equipment stolen, Watson and engineer Peter Woof scuttled the ship to prevent her from falling into the whalers' hands.

We traded a ship for a ship, but it was a great trade because we also traded our ship for the lives of hundreds of whales that would be spared from the Sierra.

Paul Watson

In February 1980, just as the Sierra was nearly completely repaired and refitted to continue whaling, unknown saboteurs hired by the Sea Shepherd Conservation Society used magnetic limpet mines to blow a hole in her side and sank the pirate whaler in Lisbon harbor, permanently ending her career.

However, Sierra was hardly the world's only pirate whaling ship. Nick Carter's continued efforts, in addition to investigations by Greenpeace and other groups, also uncovered pirate whalers in South America with an operation in Brazil labeled as a "Japanese whaling colony" by environmentalists. In Chile, a whaler operating in the service of a Panamanian front company conducted coastal whaling. In Peru, three pirate whalers were hunting year-round. Elsewhere, in Taiwan four pirate whaling ships were taking whales from the South China Sea and others out of Korea were at work in the Sea of Japan. In each case, links to Japanese companies (particularly Taiyo Gyogyo) were discovered.

=== Prosecution: South Africa ===
In April 1979, Colin Eglin, leader of the South African opposition, urged the government to investigate pirate whaling while Andrew Behr (owner of the Sierra and other pirate whalers) now denied any links to such activities. However, at the same time two Panamanian flagged whaling ships, Susan and Theresa (each named for Behr's daughters), were being converted into hybrid factory-catcher ships just like the Sierra by a South African shipbuilder.

A Cape Times reporter, Stephen Wrottesley, also discovered the Sierra Fishing Company was hiring a new crew in the Cape Town area and another ship, the MV Fisher (formerly the MV Yashima Maru), was also being refitted for whaling and was registered in Panama. Nick Carter, his colleague Nan Rice, and many other conservationists personally urged Colin Eglin to act while international environmental organizations pressured the government for an official inquiry. When port authorities ordered all South African nationals off of the Fisher, a foreign crew took the ship to the Canary Islands and it was renamed the Astrid. Soon after, the Sea Shepherd Conservation Society distributed wanted posters advertising a $25,000 reward to anyone who would sink it. Andrew Behr relocated himself and his family to England and the Susan and Theresa were seized as a result of the inquiry. The legal battle to have the ships released failed and years later the two pirate whalers were used for target practice and destroyed by the South African Navy.

=== Direct action: Spain ===
Industria Ballenera SA (IBSA) was Spain's only remaining whaling company which had operated with government support and without the restrictions of international regulations as Spain was not a member of the IWC. However, as a result of the Sierra scandal and increasing pressure from the US, Japan officially banned the import of whale meat from non-IWC members on July 5, 1979. Predictably, Spain joined the IWC at the start of its next annual meeting and continued to ship whale meat to Japan.

In December 1979, two explosions were heard in the port of Corcubión (Galicia, Spain) but the whaling ships there were not damaged. Then on April 27, 1980, the whalers Ibsa I and Ibsa II were sunk in the port of Marin by unknown saboteurs hired by the Sea Shepherd Conservation Society with limpet mines in a manner similar to the sinking of the Sierra.

Later on June 17, 1980, Greenpeace activists aboard the Rainbow Warrior confronted the whaling ship, Ibsa III, again deploying zodiacs to maneuver between the whalers and the whales. After a few hours of interference, warships from the Spanish Navy arrived to pursue and eventually board the Greenpeace ship. The activist crew was formally arrested and the Rainbow Warrior confiscated despite claims that the incident took place in international waters.

Charged in a military court, the captain of the Rainbow Warrior, Jonathan Castle, refused to pay the $142,000 fine (1,200,000 pesetas) and the ship was held in the military harbor O Ferrol. Spanish authorities disabled the activist vessel by removing the thrust block from its engine. However, for five months Greenpeace members kept the ship otherwise seaworthy while a secret effort was made to find a new thrust block. A replacement part was found, smuggled into Spain, and walked past the Spanish guards by Greenpeace members laughing and acting as if returning from a bout of drinking. Finally, on November 8 the Rainbow Warrior escaped under cover of darkness during a changing of the guard. The Spanish Navy was unable (or unwilling) to find and recapture the activists who were given a heroes' welcome in Jersey on November 11 by cheering crowds. Later, on November 15, the ship finally arrived to Amsterdam, her base.

In 1981, the Spanish Socialist Workers Party sponsored a motion long supported by organized environmental lobbying to compel Spain's IWC delegates to vote for a moratorium and immediate halt to whaling. The motion passed on December 16 of the same year with an overwhelming majority.

=== Sanctuary: Indian Ocean ===
In 1979 the influence of environmentalists was realized in the membership of the International Whaling Commission through the nation of Seychelles. Dr. Sidney Holt, a well known marine biologist and former IWC scientific committee member (one of the "Three Wise Men"), envisioned an ocean refuge for whales. Holt's companion, Lyall Watson, a respected nature writer in Seychelles, put him in contact with the nation's president, Albert Rene. The tiny island country joined the IWC and Holt watched from an NGO observer's seat as Lyall Watson led the Seychelles delegation to propose and succeed in establishing an Indian Ocean whale sanctuary.

However, the environmental victory did not come without cost. Japan responded in 1980 by ending a grant scheme to Seychelles for a fisheries research and training vessel. A letter from the Japanese ambassador explained this grant would not be extended to the tiny island nation due to its position in the International Whaling Commission and stated this decision would be reversed if the attitude of the Seychelles government changed at the IWC. Surprisingly, Maxine Ferrari, the Seychelles Minister of Development and Planning, quickly rejected and condemned Japan's actions. On January 9, 1981, the Sumi Maru No. 25, a Japanese fishing boat, was seized while fishing in Seychelles waters and fined $115,000. In April, 1982, Japanese Prime Minister Zenko Suzuki offered a $40 million aid package to Seychelles which was ultimately rejected as well.

In this particular case, the Ministry of Foreign Affairs regrets to note that the Japanese government, wilst expressing annoyance with Seychelles' positive stand in the IWC, did not take into consideration the indiscriminate and rapacious exploitation of the Seychelles fisheries resources by the Japanese fishing fleet over many years in the recent past. Making Japanese advanced technology available to Seychelles to sort out the mess left behind by Japanese fishermen would constitute but a meager form of restitution.

Seychelles MoFA

=== Invasion: Siberia ===
The Soviets reasoned that the best way to conduct a subsistence hunt was to employ a single modern whaling ship, the Zevezdny, to catch whales on behalf of the Siberian native people. Instead of the average 10 to 30 whales historically claimed in one year, after 1955 the quota rose to nearly 200 gray whales and international observers were not permitted.

On August 9, 1981, Paul Watson led a new crew, aboard the Sea Shepherd II, from Nome, Alaska into the territorial waters of the Soviet Union. When the activists arrived at the Soviet whaling station village of Loren they quickly discovered that the whaling operation had been dedicated to producing feed for a commercial mink farm, complete with non-aboriginal blonde haired, blue eyed Russian workers. They managed to film and photograph the whaling station. The evidence was later turned over to Congress. The activists were soon running from the Russian military, including helicopter gunships and a destroyer, but managed to escape into American waters.

On July 18, 1983, Greenpeace made its own incursion into Siberia during the week of the annual IWC conference. Greenpeace also landed at the whaling station at Loren. However, the Russians were not going to be caught off guard again. Soldiers and police arrested the seven that made it ashore. The Rainbow Warrior was also chased by warships and helicopters and after a six-hour ordeal safely returned to the US.

The Greenpeace activists were held captive for several days before a transfer was arranged with an American delegation led by Nome, Alaska Mayor, Leo Rasmussen. On the US-Russian border in the Bering Strait, the Rainbow Warrior peacefully met Russian warships to retrieve its crew. Rasmussen gave the Soviets an "I Love Nome" button and returned with the activists aboard a Greenpeace zodiac.

=== Investigation: Chile ===
In January 1979, a Greenpeace investigator, Campbell Plowden, narrowly avoided arrest by the Chilean DINA (secret police) as he gathered information, including photographic evidence, on the whaling operation in San Vicente, Chile|. In 1981, two more Greenpeace activists covertly researched Chilean coastal whaling. They found a fleet of three outdated whaling ships that were only able to land 77 whales in 1976 but increased the quota to 500 in 1978.

Greenpeace discovered Japan's investment in Chilean whaling included a hybrid catcher-factory ship originally named the Orient Maru No. 2, then renamed the Paulmy Star III, and in 1980 it became the Juan 9. Although it was prohibited to sell whaling equipment to non-members, export documents revealed the whaling ship was falsely listed as a shrimp trawler before Chile joined the IWC. The whalers consistently violated IWC regulations including hunting out of season and killing protected species. In 1984, the propeller shaft of the Juan 9 broke resulting in financial troubles that led creditors to seize the ship the next year.

=== Investigation: Taiwan ===
In 1979 and 1980, Greenpeace activists gathered evidence of pirate whaling operations in the South China Sea and uncovered a regional unregulated whale meat trade implicating Taiwan, South Korea, and Japan. Taiwan officials denied the existence of the pirate whalers, and Japan denied importing whale meat from Taiwan. However, the investigators discovered four (formerly Japanese) whaling ships (Sea Bird, Sea Flower, Chi Hsin, Chu Feng) with Taiwanese crews, Japanese officers, and Panamanian flags.

The investigation continued in Japan's Tsukiji market where Campbell Plowden and Rebecca Clark found whale meat, packed by Marine Enterprises Co. Ltd (a South Korean front company), that had originally come from Taiwan. In 1979, Japan reported the import of 1,800 tons of whale meat from South Korea, but the Koreans had only reported the export of 400 tons. This led Plowden and Clark to the Marine Enterprises processing plant to gather proof of Taiwan provided whale meat repackaged as a product of Korea for shipment to Japan.

In late February 1980, just days after these findings were reported to the United States government, Japanese customs agents seized 300 tons of Korean whale meat as illegally imported from Taiwan. The Taiwanese government responded to the threat of sanctions from the US and to the loss of Japan's support by impounding the pirate whaling ships.

=== Direct action: Peru ===
In February 1978, an endangered blue whale washed ashore near the town of Conchan, Peru and died from massive harpoon wounds as Peruvian conservationist, Felipe Benavides watched.

A Peruvian subsidiary of Japan's Taiyo Fisheries, known as Victoria del Mar, operated three coastal whaling ships (Victoria 1, 2, and 7) with a shore station in Paita. In 1982, Greenpeace sent in the Rainbow Warrior. On the December 13, several Greenpeace activists boarded the Victoria 7 and chained themselves to the harpoon cannon. A day later, Peruvian marines cut the chains and arrested the protesters.

The Greenpeace activists were threatened with charges of piracy. However, many Peruvians protested on their behalf including Felipe Benavides, who had opposed whaling for nearly 30 years. After several days, the activists were released with a $3,000 fine, and two weeks later, the Rainbow Warrior was released as well. Despite continued protest and international diplomatic pressure, Peru continued whaling until 1986.

=== Ban on commercial whaling ===
Legal status of whaling: IWC states that ban whaling (since 1986) / IWC states with aboriginal whaling; IWC states with commercial whaling / Non-IWC states with aboriginal whaling; Non-IWC states with commercial whaling / Non-IWC states without whaling

After growing pressure from member nations, in 1979, the IWC established the Indian Ocean Whale Sanctuary as a practical conservation measure. Three years later, in 1982, the IWC adopted a moratorium on commercial whaling, which took effect in 1986 and allowed for scientific research whaling. When Japan resumed whale hunts under the auspices of a research program, some anti-whaling countries and organizations criticized the moratorium's loophole for continued commercial whaling. On March 31, 2014, the International Court of Justice ruled that Japan must stop its whaling in the Antarctic.

In 1994, the IWC created the Southern Ocean Whale Sanctuary in Antarctica to protect whales in their breeding grounds. Two additional sanctuaries were proposed in 1998 by anti-whaling nations, but they failed to get enough votes in the IWC.

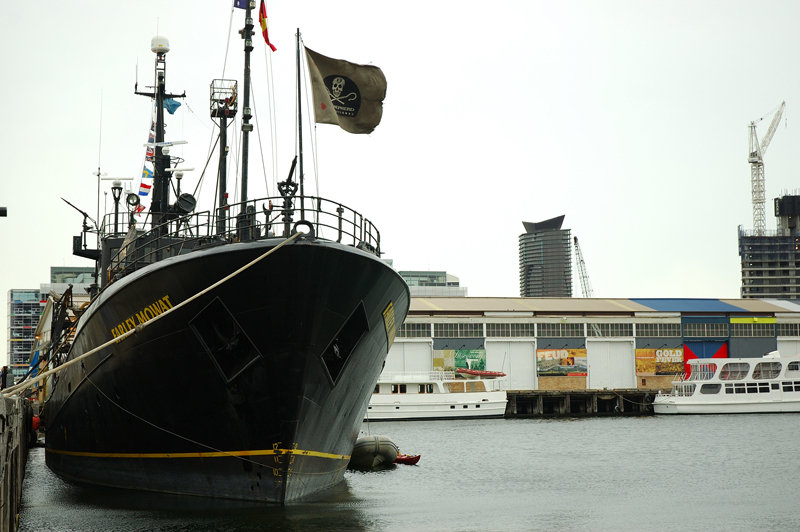
Sea Shepherd's RV Farley Mowat, docked in Melbourne before setting out to pursue the Japanese whaling fleet in 2005

=== Modern conflicts ===
Throughout the past decade , while pro- and anti-whaling nations debated and deliberated at the IWC, private activists have organized a range of protests against commercial whaling. Most notably, Greenpeace and Sea Shepherd Conservation Society continue separate campaigns of direct action against whale hunts conducted by Norway, Iceland, and Japan. Both also conduct media campaigns and other public outreach to raise awareness. Each organization criticizes the other for differing activist philosophies and each, in turn, receives criticism from both pro- and anti-whaling countries.

Tensions have grown over the past few years during Sea Shepherd's confrontations with Japanese whaling vessels in the whale sanctuary off the coast of Antarctica. In 2008, the documentary-style TV series Whale Wars began filming these confrontations, bringing some light to both sides of the controversy. The same year, two Greenpeace protesters were arrested in Japan for their investigation of whale meat. "The governments of Australia and New Zealand, which have responsibility for maritime rescue in the area where the whale hunt is usually conducted, have repeatedly urged both sides to tone their responses down."

More recently , the Australian government, as an anti-whaling member of the IWC, set a November 2010 deadline to stop Japanese whaling in the Southern Ocean or face an international legal challenge. However, the IWC's ban on commercial whaling is under debate and could be overturned by the end of 2010. In a compromise aimed at ending a deadlock between anti-whaling nations and whaling countries, such as Norway, Iceland, and Japan, the IWC would permit limited commercial hunting. The IWC proposal drew immediate criticism from environmentalists, who described it as "disaster for whales".

== Subsistence hunting ==
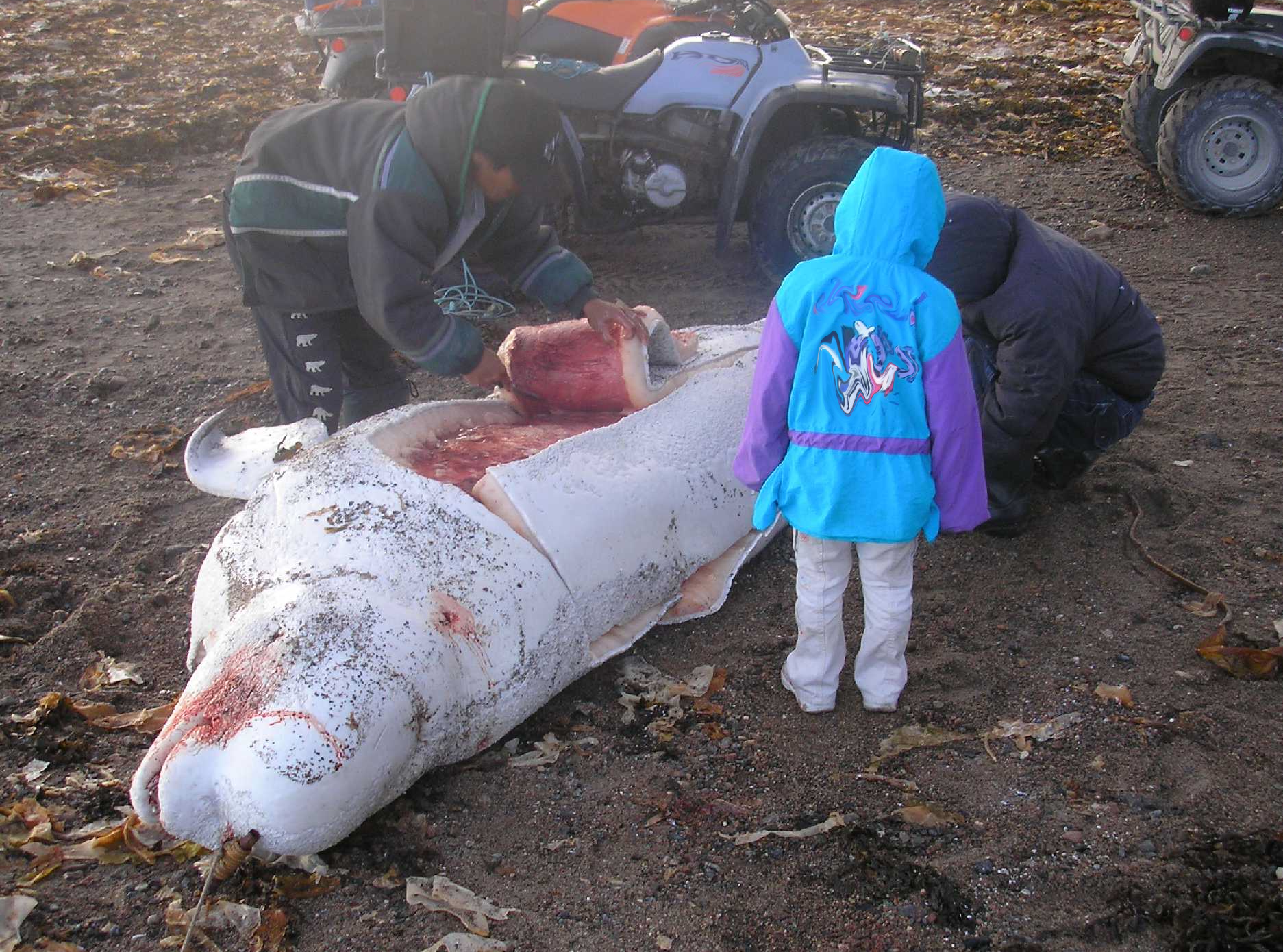
Inuit subsistence whaling. A beluga whale is flensed for its maktaaq which is an important source of vitamin C in the diet of some Inuit.

There has been some resistance to subsistence hunting by the Sea Shepherd group. When the Makah people tried to revive their traditional hunt it was disrupted by Sea Shepherd's "chase boats". Greenpeace took a different position in stating that cultural revival of whaling by groups like the Makah is not the problem. Greenpeace opposes all commercial whaling, claiming that it is not sustainable. However, they state that they do not oppose subsistence whaling by indigenous peoples. They promote whale watching as an alternative economic activity to commercial whaling.

== Organizations ==
The following organizations have taken part in or supported anti-whaling activities.

- Sea Shepherd Conservation Society
- Greenpeace
- Sierra Club
- Whalewatch
- World Wide Fund for Nature

== Methods and tactics ==
Anti-whaling action is a part of both environmental activism and marine conservation. Forms of expression may include but are not limited to protest as demonstration and direct action, outreach through media, and political maneuvering.

=== Protest ===
Often the most visible expression of anti-whaling activism is through public demonstration of protest: nonviolent action by groups of people, ranging from simple display of public signage and banners to picketing, walking in a march, or meeting (rally) to hear speakers. Actions such as blockades and sit-ins may also be referred to as demonstrations, although these would normally be considered direct action.

Direct action is activity undertaken by individuals, groups, or governments to achieve anti-whaling goals outside of normal social/political channels: nonviolent and violent activities which target persons, groups, or property deemed to be engaged in whaling, commercial or otherwise. Examples of nonviolent direct action include strikes, blockades, workplace occupations, sit-ins, and graffiti. Violent direct actions include sabotage, vandalism, and assault. Direct actions are sometimes a form of civil disobedience, but some (such as strikes) do not always violate criminal law.

=== Outreach ===
While protest often leads to publicity of anti-whaling activities, there are more direct ways to raise public awareness. Media activism uses media and communication technologies for social movement, and/or tries to change policies relating to media and communication. Websites, newsletters, calls to action, pamphlets, books, speaking tours, rallies and mass mailings are all examples of outreach efforts.

Other more formal ways of affecting change are political campaigning, diplomacy, negotiation and arbitration, and lobbying are methods of influencing decisions made by the government (in groups or individually). This includes all attempts to influence legislators and officials, whether by other legislators, constituents, or organized groups.

== See also ==
- Conservation
- Eco-Pirate: The Story of Paul Watson
- Southern Ocean Whale Sanctuary
- Marine conservation activism
- Whale conservation
