= Uruguayan Whale and Dolphin Sanctuary =

Protected area in the south Atlantic

- IUCN category V (protected landscape/seascape)
- Location within South America
- Coordinates: 35.5°S 52.5°W
- Area: 125,436 km^{2} (48,431 sq mi)

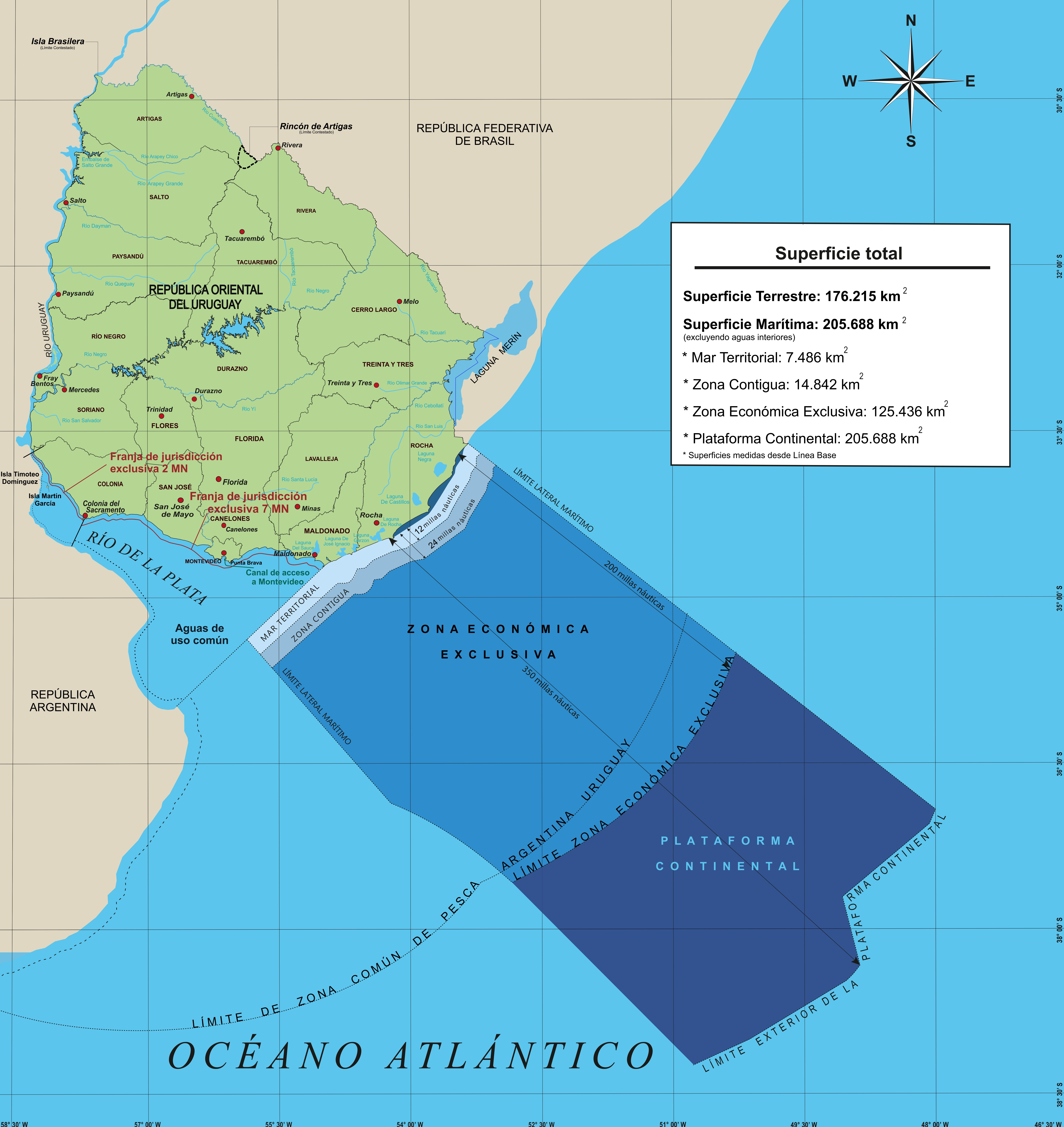
The sanctuary encompasses the entirety of the Uruguayan Exclusive Economic Zone.

The Uruguayan Whale and Dolphin Sanctuary, established in 2013, is a maritime space aimed to protect dolphins and whales from hunting, pursuit, aggression or intentional dibsturbance in waters within the Uruguayan maritime jurisdiction, located in the southern Atlantic Ocean. The sanctuary encompasses the entire Uruguayan territorial waters and exclusive economic zone (EEZ), extending as far as 200 nautical miles (370 km) from the coast and covering a total of 125,436 km^{2} (48,431 mi^{2}).

== Description ==
Despite their modest extension, Uruguayan waters exhibit an important diversity of cetaceans. To date, 30 different species were recorded and cited, comprising almost 28% of the total number of mammals cited for Uruguay. Whereas most of them have widespread distributions, some of them, like Pontoporia blainvillei and Phocoena spinipinnis are especially relevant for conservation because of their restricted distribution to the coastal waters of South America.

According to Uruguayan law, the Whale and Dolphin Sanctuary implies that the following activities are prohibited in the Uruguayan territorial sea and exclusive economic zone, whether carried out by a national or foreign vessel:

- The pursuit, hunting, fishing, appropriation, or processing of any species of whales and dolphins.
- The transport and landing of live whales and dolphins, except in cases of scientific or sanitary interest, as declared by the competent national authorities.
- The retention, aggression, or intentional disturbance that leads to the death of any species of whales and dolphins.

== History ==
In 2002, the Maldonado Bay, next to Punta del Este, was declared a "Whale Sanctuary" thanks to an initiative led by young students, the Maldonado government, the Ministry of Tourism, and Organization for Cetacean Conservation (OCC).

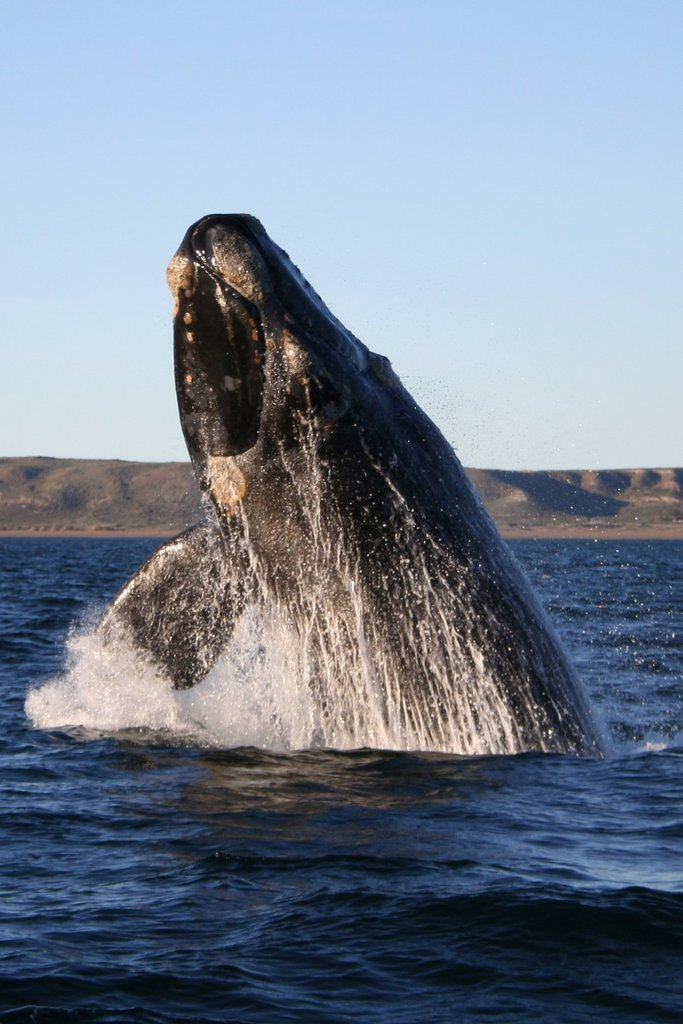
The southern right whale can be seen from July to October during their annual migration through the sanctuary to the warmer Brazilian waters.

In 2008, OCC gathered over seven thousand signatures from Uruguayan, Latin American, and international supporters—including 20 organizations—calling for Uruguay to rejoin the International Whaling Commission (IWC) after 22 years of absence. That same year, Uruguay re-entered the IWC, giving new momentum to the sanctuary initiative.

In 2013, a group of students from School No. 27, representing the departments of Maldonado and Rocha, reignited the project. Alongside OCC, they presented a proposed law to the Environmental Commission of the House of Representatives. On September 8, 2013, the law was passed with unanimous support in Parliament—all 62 votes.

The campaign was supported by prominent cultural figures, including Eduardo Galeano, Carlos Páez Vilaró, Agó Páez, Mariana Ingold, Julio Víctor González, and Gustavo Cordera.

Eduardo Galeano, a prominent Uruguayan writer, wrote a poem called "Sanctuary of Life" as part of a campaign pushing for the creation of the sanctuary:

If sharks made movies, who would be the villains?
How would the novel of Moby Dick have been, if the white whale had written it?
What do the sea and its creatures think of us?
If the sea could speak, what would it say?
Perhaps it would say: "I don't want to be a factory".
And it would say: "I don't want to be a garbage dump".
And it would say: "I don't want to be a cemetery".
From the sea came life, when life began to live,
and the sea wants to remain the untouchable Sanctuary of life.

— Eduardo Galeano, Sanctuary of Life

== See also ==
- Whale sanctuary
- Australian Whale Sanctuary
- Indian Ocean Whale Sanctuary
- Southern Ocean Whale Sanctuary
