= American Cetacean Society =

American conservation organization

- Abbreviation: ACS
- Formation: November 3, 1967
- Type: 501(c)(3) nonprofit organization
- Purpose: Marine conservation and protection of cetaceans
- Headquarters: San Pedro, Los Angeles, California, United States
- Region served: United States

The American Cetacean Society (ACS) is a whale conservation group and was the first of its kind when founded in 1967. ACS is a 501(c)(3) non-profit organization with an office in San Pedro, California and chapters in Los Angeles, Orange County, Puget Sound (Seattle), Monterey, San Francisco, and a Student Coalition based out of Indiana University. The mission of the American Cetacean Society is to protect whales, dolphins, porpoises, and their habitats through public education, research grants, and conservation actions. ACS's programs are almost entirely conducted by volunteers.

== How it began ==
While founders Bemi DeBus and Clark Cameron were exploring the notion of eradicating world hunger by "farming" whales, they discovered that the whales themselves needed saving. They looked for an appropriate conservation group to collaborate with, but found nothing. With the help of the scientists, educators, and yacht owners who volunteered to take people whale watching, ACS was launched on November 3, 1967. At that time, it was the only whale conservation group on the planet and the first to take groups of children on whale watching trips.

During the past 30 years, more than two million children and thousands of adults have enjoyed whale watching trips sponsored by ACS. The impact of these grassroots efforts can be measured by the increasing worldwide popularity of whale watching (a one billion dollar per year industry that now attracts nine million participants in 87 countries) and the growth of a global conservation movement that ACS helped to launch.

ACS's grassroots efforts to raise awareness and inspire people through whale watching and other educational programs led to a campaign that produced one of conservation's greatest success stories - the recovery of the Pacific gray whale. This is the only species of great whales to be removed from the Endangered Species List.

== What the American Cetacean Society does ==
At the national level, ACS maintains a web site with free educational resources, such as fact sheets for various cetacean species, as well as more than 200 educational organizations, such Discovery.com, National Geographic, PBS, the Smithsonian Institution, and Scientific American.

Each of the Chapters have signature programs. For example, the Los Angeles Chapter conducts one of the longest running gray whale censuses in the U.S. Both the Los Angeles and the Orange County chapters conduct naturalist training programs.

Most chapters also conduct research grant programs to support research on cetacean issues.

Most chapters participate in local marine science educational events, and hand out free educational resources for teachers and students.

Since one of ACS's goals is to promote conservation which is based on science, all of these free educational resources are reviewed by ACS's scientific advisory board prior to distribution. Both the chapters and the national organization have scientific advisory boards. The current national scientific advisory board includes John Calambokidis, a senior research biologist and co-founder of Cascadia Research; John Ford, who leads the Marine Mammal Group in the Conservation Biology Section within the science branch of the Department of Fisheries and Oceans Canada; Denise Herzing, the Research Director of the Wild Dolphin Project; Hal Whitehead, professor of biology at Dalhousie University in Halifax, Nova Scotia, Canada; and others.

ACS also participates in conservation advocacy campaigns, such as preventing the use of harmful sonar. ACS regularly sends a representative to meetings of the International Whaling Commission to persuade its members to uphold the moratorium on commercial whaling.

=== Research supported ===
- Mathews, Elizabeth A.; Keller, Steven; Weiner, David B. (1988). "A Method to Collect and Process Skin Biopsies for Cell Culture from Free-Ranging Gray Whales (Eschrichtius Robustus)". Marine Mammal Science. 4 (1): 1–12. doi:10.1111/j.1748-7692.1988.tb00178.x.
- : doi:10.1111/j.1748-7692.1999.tb00892.xLevenson, David H.; Schusterman, Ronald J. (August 26, 2006). "Dark Adaptation and Visual Sensitivity in Shallow and deep-diving Pinnipeds". Marine Mammal Science. 15 (4): 1303–1313. doi:10.1111/j.1748-7692.1999.tb00892.x.
- Tershy, Bernie R.; Breese, Dawn; Alvarez-Borrego, Saul (January 24, 1991). "Increase in cetacean and seabird numbers in the Canal de Ballenas during an El Nino-Southern Oscillation event" (PDF). Marine Ecology Progress Series. 69: 299–302.
- Return and Survival of Humpback Whale (Metaptera Novaneangliae) Calves born to a Single Female in Three Consecutive Years: doi:10.1111/j.1748-7692.1993.tb00461.x
- Asymmetrical Pigmentation in the Fin Whale: a Test of Two Feeding Related Hypotheses: doi:10.1111/j.1748-7692.1992.tb00416.x
