= Hawaiian Islands Humpback Whale National Marine Sanctuary =

NOAA Conservation & EcoFutures Education Destination

- IUCN category IV (habitat/species management area)
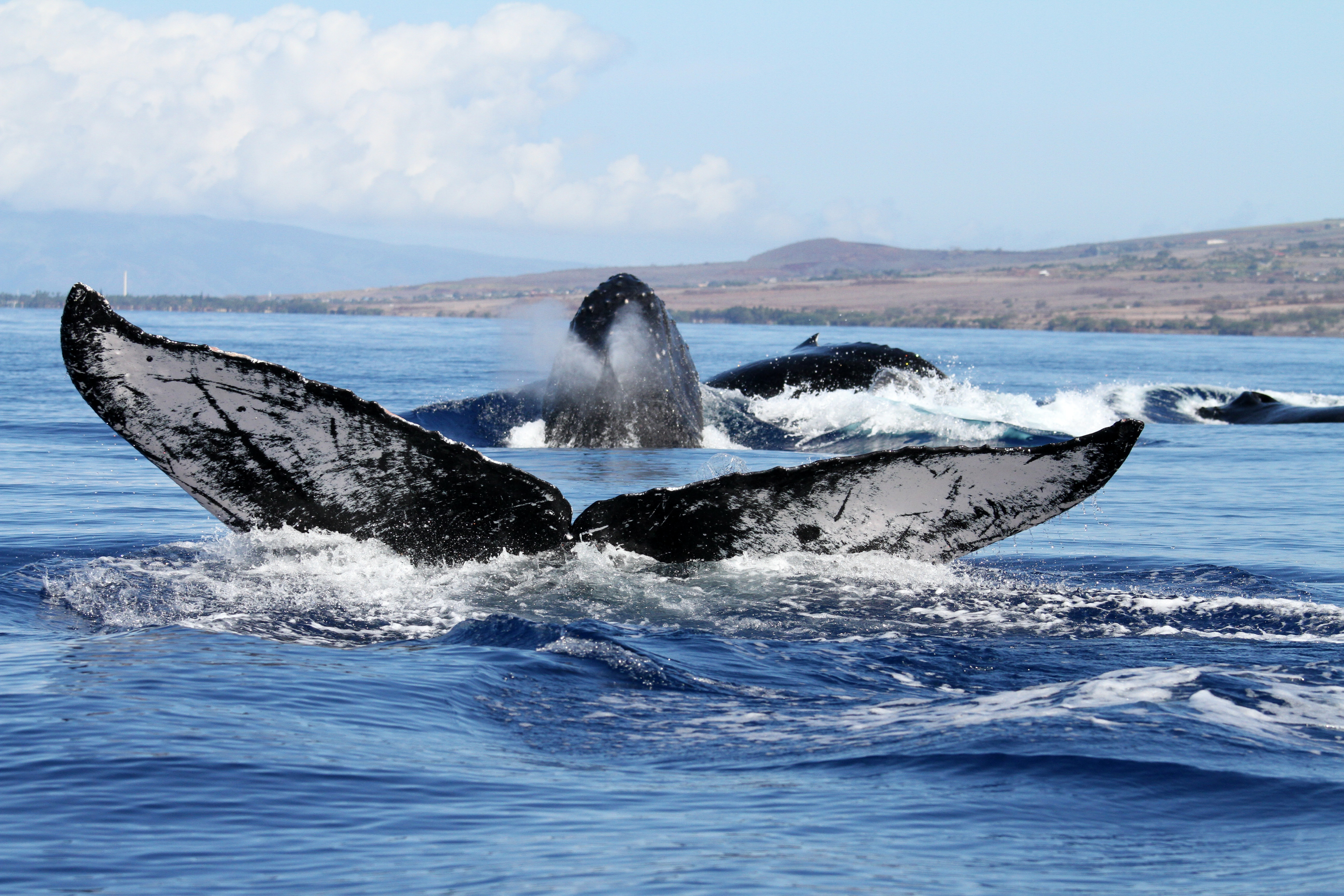

- Location within Hawaii
- Location: Hawaii, United States
- Coordinates: 20.936°N 156.77°W
- Area: 1,400 square miles (3,626 km^{2})
- Designated: November 4, 1992; 33 years ago
- Website: hawaiihumpbackwhale.noaa.gov

The Hawaiian Islands Humpback Whale National Marine Sanctuary is one of the world's most important whale habitats, hosting thousands of humpbacks (Megaptera novaeangliae) each winter.

== Sanctuary ==
The sanctuary encompasses 1,400 square miles (3,600 km^{2}) in the islands' waters. It was designated by United States Congress on November 4, 1992, as a National Marine Sanctuary to protect the endangered North Pacific humpback whale and its habitat The sanctuary promotes management, research, education and long-term monitoring.

With its boundaries including waters from the shoreline to depths of 600 feet (180 m) in many areas, the sanctuary encompasses a variety of marine ecosystems, including seagrass beds and coral reefs. Much of the sanctuary has fringing coral reefs close to shore and deeper coral reefs offshore. Hawaii's coral reefs are noted for their isolation. Over 25% of all Hawaii's reef animals are endemic, found nowhere else on Earth.

The Hawaii sanctuary is unlike any other National Marine Sanctuary in that it targets a single species, relies entirely on other agencies for enforcement, and has no protective rules such as no-go zones or no-wake zones or no-take zones that are specific to the sanctuary. It even allows permitted dumping of ship waste within its borders.

== History ==
In March 1982, NOAA advocated creating a national marine sanctuary in Hawaii's waters. Public workshops allowed scientists and the community to discuss the proposal. Some community members voiced opposition, fearing that a marine sanctuary would further restrict fishing and traffic. In early 1984, Hawaii's then-Governor George Ariyoshi suspended further consideration of the sanctuary. In October 1990, Congress again directed NOAA to determine the feasibility of a national marine sanctuary in Hawaii. The designation finalized on November 4, 1992.

In response to public concern, the Act allowed the Secretary of Commerce, in consultation with the Governor, to modify the sanctuary's boundaries. Numerous public meetings and hearings followed on each of the main islands. The program also established a Sanctuary Advisory Council, made up of government agencies and the public.

To increase public support, the sanctuary essentially incorporated existing protections without additional measures. Those restrictions primarily dealt with approach and harassment, waste discharge, and alteration of the sea bed. The prohibition on waste discharge had a significant exception: boaters could obtain permits to discharge waste inside the sanctuary, as most have continued to do.

Not until June 5, 1997, did Governor Benjamin Cayetano formally approve the sanctuary.

== Education Center and Kauaʻi Ocean Discovery ==
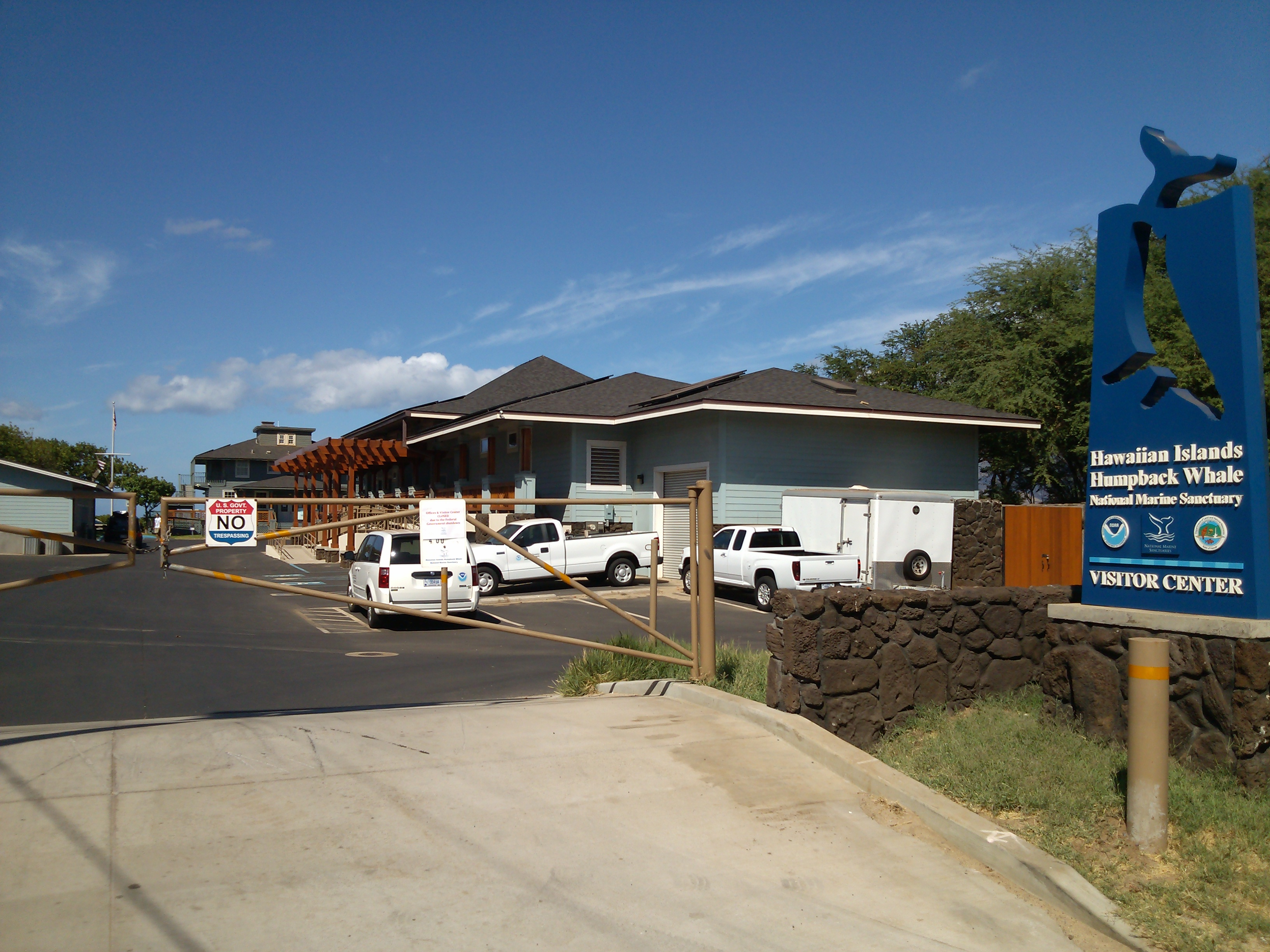
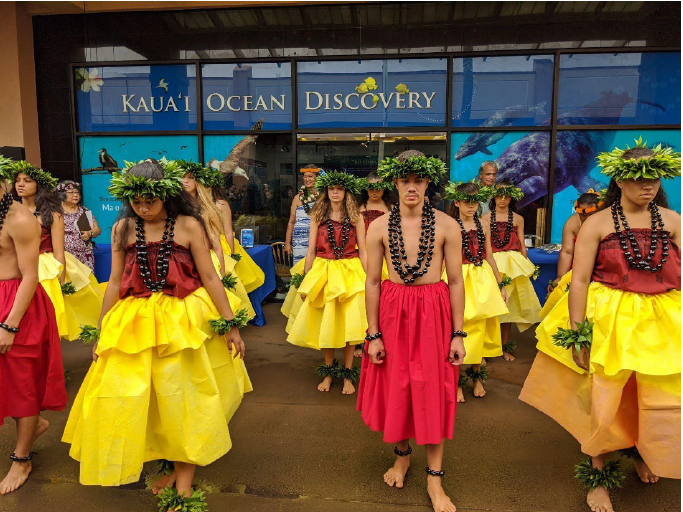
LEFT: The Sanctuary Education Center in Kihei, Maui. RIGHT: Hula practitioners at the opening of Kauaʻi Ocean Discovery in Lihue, Kauai, in 2020.

The Sanctuary Education Center is located in Kihei, Maui and features exhibits about the natural and cultural history of humpback whales and other marine life found in the sanctuary. The center offers public education programs and lectures, and features a marine science library.

Kauaʻi Ocean Discovery, a visitor center for the sanctuary, opened in Lihue, Kauai, in 2020.

== Planning ==
The NMSP periodically executes a five-year-long review of sanctuary management plans. During the review, a sanctuary may revise operations, management, programs, site-specific regulations, boundaries and management zones. In September 2002, Governor Cayetano approved the plan. Another planning cycle is under way.

== Humpback whales ==
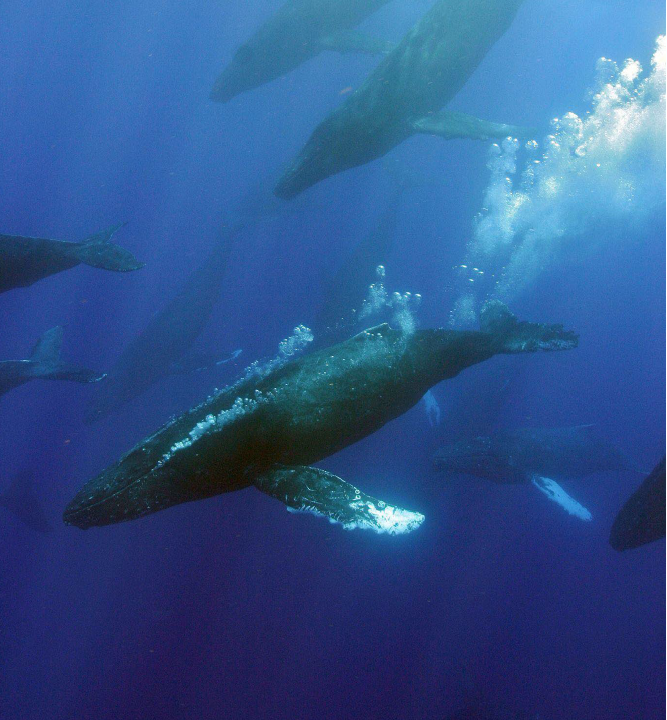
Humpback whales in the sanctuary.

Almost two-thirds of North Pacific humpback whales (estimates range from 4,000 to 10,000 whales) migrates to Hawaiian waters each winter to bear and nurse their calves and to mate, although not to eat. Their throats are only the size of a large dinner plate or a volleyball. While in Alaska they spend a majority of their time eating, feeding mainly on krill. They can cover nearly 3,000 miles (4,800 km) of open ocean in less than two months' time This population is growing an estimated 7% per year, but is still greatly diminished from the estimated 15,000 to 20,000 in the days before the whaling ban.

In 1966 the International Whaling Commission (IWC) put them in a protected status worldwide, outlawing whaling, but large illegal kills continued into the 1970s. Currently humpbacks are thought to number about 30,000–40,000 worldwide, which is approximately 30–35 percent of their pre-whaling population.

Compared to other whales, the humpback whale has extremely long flippers which reach up to 30 percent of its length of up to 40 feet (12 m). At their full grown length they can reach up to 55 feet long, and weighs about one ton for every square foot. The whale appears dark from the top while its flippers and tail, the sides and underside appear partially white and are noticeable when they are beginning dive as are their small dorsal fins. These white markings on their flukes are unique, each working as a personal fingerprint that scientists use to identify them. These whales are air breathers, rising to the surface every thirty or so minutes. Their exhale can rise up to 15 feet into the air, clocking at a speed of 300 mph(the human sneeze at its fastest is about 100 mph).

When born, calves are generally 10 to 15 feet long. They feed off their mother's milk, which is produced and fed to their calves through mammary gland slits. The calf is able to roll its tongue into a tube and siphon in the milk that is ejected into the water. Occasionally pods of dolphins are found trailing mothers and their calves, and it has been speculated that they are consuming be leftover milk that the calf does not eat.

All efforts to attach tracking devices to these whales have failed because of their constant movement. These whales are known for "breaching", in which they throw their body out of the water. Scientists have only been able to speculate as to why they do this, theories include using the motion to knock barnacles off, show of dominance, mark personal space etc. There is generally a lot action when there are groupings of males, anywhere from two to ten whales, that come together in what's known as a competition pod. In these groupings the males are showing off and sometimes fighting over the position of being a females escort for the season. Many times the whales will use their pectoral fins and flukes to slam each other, leavening bruises and cuts from the barnacles attached to their skin.

Male humpback whales produce vocalizations described as "songs" over 10–20 minute periods. Whales in different areas of the world sing different songs, but those in the same area sing the same song. A song can be repeated for hours. They change slightly from year to year. The whales engage in many other interesting behaviors that can be observed from shore.

== Human uses ==
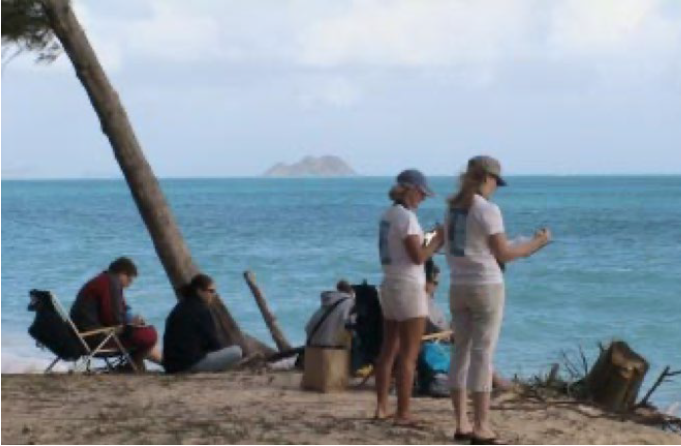
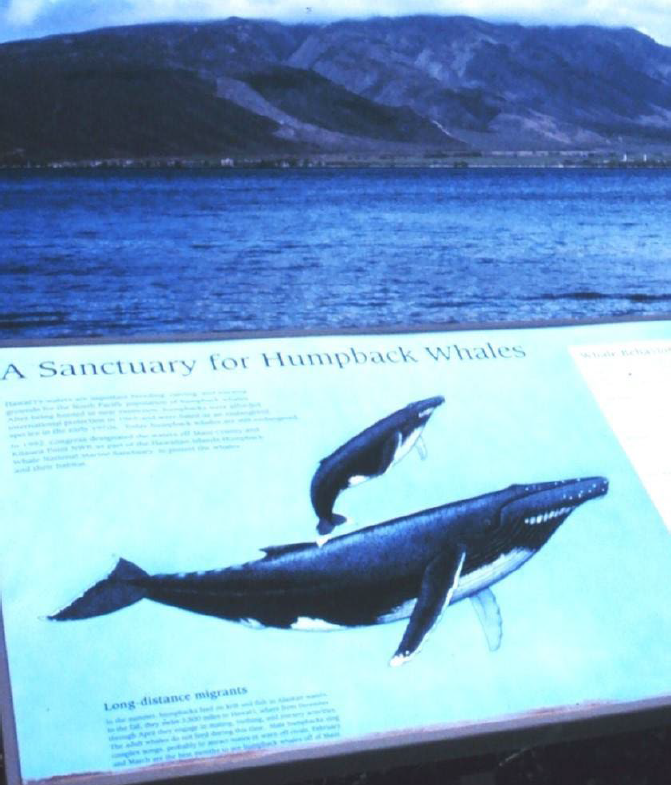
LEFT: Volunteers participate in the sanctuary's Ocean Count event in early 2006. RIGHT: A sign installed in 1993 at a vantage point in Hawaii after the creation of the sanctuary..

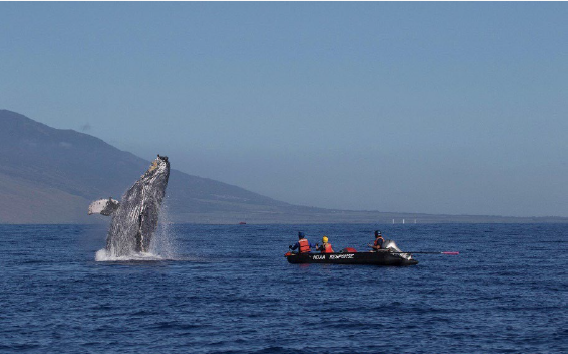
A humpback whale that breached several times after responders freed it from entanglement by fishing gear in the sanctuary in 2018.

Native Hawaiians have long had close relationships with their marine environment. Nowadays, sanctuary waters are also used for recreation, fishing and shipping. Commercial operations feature whale watching, sportfishing, parasailing and snorkeling, while commercial fishing, cruise ships and commercial shipping transit the same area. One of the sanctuary's main purposes is to find ways to conduct these activities that have minimal impact on humpback whales and their habitat.

Protecting humpback whales and their habitat is very important for the continued success of Hawai`i's whalewatching industry. A recent study estimates that commercial whalewatching alone supports as many as 390 jobs and $27 million in revenues. Through its many activities, the sanctuary helps protect this economic contribution.

== See also ==
- Hawaiʻi Institute of Marine Biology
- List of marine protected areas of Hawaii
