= Australian Whale Sanctuary =

Protected whale and dolphin area established by Australia

- Interactive map of Australian Whale Sanctuary
- Coordinates: 35°18′07.51″S 149°08′03.70″E
- Established: 1999
- Governing body: Department of the Environment and Energy

The Australian Whale Sanctuary, established in 1999, aims to protect dolphins and whales from hunting in waters within the Australian government's jurisdiction.

The sanctuary encompasses the entire Australian Exclusive Economic Zone (EEZ), extending 200 nautical miles (370 km) surrounding the continent of Australia and its external dependencies such as Christmas Island (in the Indian Ocean), Cocos (Keeling) Island, Norfolk Island, Macquarie Island and Heard Island and McDonald Islands. Additionally, it includes the EEZ adjacent to the coastline of the Australian Antarctic Territory, recognised only by the United Kingdom, New Zealand, France and Norway.

The sanctuary is the scene of an ongoing controversy between Australia and Japan over whaling. In 2008 the Federal Court of Australia ruled it was illegal under Australian law for the Japanese whaling fleet to kill whales in the Sanctuary. In 2015 Kyodo Senpaku Kaisha Ltd was found guilty of wilful contempt of court and fined A$1,000,000.

== See also ==
- Whale watching in Australia
- Uruguayan Whale and Dolphin Sanctuary
- Whaling controversy
