= South Pacific Whale Sanctuary =

Proposed region where whaling would be prohibited

The South Pacific Whale Sanctuary (SPWS) was a proposed region of the South Pacific Ocean in which whaling would be prohibited.

The establishment of a South Pacific Whale Sanctuary by the International Whaling Commission has been a major goal of New Zealand foreign policy. The proposed sanctuary would have created protected waters covering 12 million square kilometres, stretching from the Equator to the Southern Ocean and from Australia's east coast to between Pitcairn Island and Easter Island.

The proposal was rejected at the 52nd annual International Whaling Commission meeting 3-6 July 2000 in Adelaide, Australia. Japan had campaigned against the proposal.
