= Indian Ocean Whale Sanctuary =

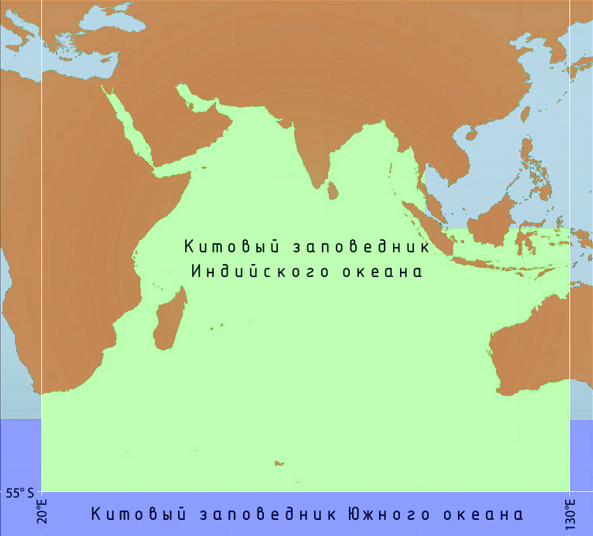
Map of the Sanctuary

The Indian Ocean Whale Sanctuary is an area in the Indian Ocean where the International Whaling Commission (IWC) has banned all types of commercial whaling. The IWC has at present designated two such sanctuaries, the other being the Southern Ocean Whale Sanctuary. Repeated proposals at the IWC for a South Atlantic Sanctuary and a South Pacific Sanctuary have never reached the 75% majority needed to pass.

== History ==
The Indian Ocean Sanctuary was established by the IWC in 1979 after being proposed by the tiny island nation of the Seychelles, in its first meeting as an IWC member, partly in order to protect whales in their breeding grounds.

The status of the Whale Sanctuaries is reviewed by the IWC every 10 years, and the Indian Ocean Sanctuary has so far been reviewed (and extended) three times, in 1989, 1992 and 2002.

== Area ==
The Indian Ocean Whale Sanctuary extends south to 55°S latitude with a western boundary of 20°E longitude by Africa and an eastern boundary of 130°E longitude by Australia. To the south it borders the Southern Ocean Whale Sanctuary.
