= Southern Ocean Whale Sanctuary =

Whale sanctuary in the Southern Ocean

The Southern Ocean Whale Sanctuary is an area of 50 million square kilometres surrounding the continent of Antarctica where the International Whaling Commission (IWC) has banned all types of commercial whaling. To date, the IWC has designated two such sanctuaries, the other being the Indian Ocean Whale Sanctuary.

== Area ==
The northern boundary of the sanctuary follows the 40°S parallel of latitude except in the Indian Ocean sector where it joins the southern boundary of the Indian Ocean Whale Sanctuary at 55°S, and around South America and into the South Pacific where the boundary is at 60°S.

== History ==
The Southern Ocean Whale Sanctuary was established by the IWC in 1994 with 23 countries supporting the agreement and Japan opposing it.

The status of the Southern Ocean Sanctuary is reviewed and open to change by the IWC every 10 years. During the 2004 meeting a proposal was made by Japan to remove the sanctuary, but it failed to reach the 75% majority required (it received 25 votes in favour and 30 votes against with two abstentions).

== Controversy and enforcement ==
While commercial whaling is prohibited in the Southern Ocean Whale Sanctuary, Japan's Institute of Cetacean Research (ICR) has continued to hunt whales inside the Sanctuary in accordance with a provision in the IWC charter permitting whaling for the purposes of scientific research. Japan clarified its position on whaling in a number of forums, noting that while some whale species are threatened, many such as minke whale are not. Some conservation groups such as the Sea Shepherd Conservation Society claim Japan's whaling operations are conducted in violation of the IWC charter, arguing that Japan's self-imposed annual quota of 1000 whale kills for research is not really scientific activity, but rather a veil to cover commercial fishing operations as whale meat ends up being sold in Japanese markets.

In an open letter to the Japanese government, published in 2002 in The New York Times and sponsored by the World Wildlife Fund (WWF), 21 scientists declared that they "believe Japan's whale 'research' program fails to meet minimum standards for credible science". They were "concerned that Japan's whaling program is not designed to answer scientific questions relevant to the management of whales; that Japan refuses to make the information it collects available for independent review; and that its research program lacks testable hypotheses or other performance indicators consistent with accepted scientific standards". They accused Japan of "using the pretense of scientific research to evade its commitments to the world community".

The Australian delegation to the IWC has argued to repeal the provision that allows nations to harvest whales for scientific research, to no effect.

Japan, meanwhile, lodged a formal objection to the sanctuary with regard to minke whales, meaning that the terms of the sanctuary do not apply to its harvest of that species within the boundaries of the sanctuary. Claiming the Japanese whaling fleet's actions to be illegal, the Sea Shepherd Conservation Society acts against Japanese whaling ships engaged in yearly hunts, attempting to interrupt or cut short the whaling activities. The ICR considers the activists' methods as constituting piracy, terrorism, and illegal harassment of the ICR fleet. Critics of the ICR point out that recent scientific advances allow for the use of non-lethal techniques in cetacean research, such as biopsies or determination of cetacean dietary intake through analysis of DNA samples from whale feces.

During the 2010/2011 whaling season, the ICR was forced to halt its whaling operations due to the actions of the Sea Shepherd Conservation Society, having harvested 172 whales (a fifth of their season quota). The ICR dispatched its whaling fleet as usual to the Northwest Pacific survey (JARPN II), with a quota for 260 whales, including 100 Minkes.

== Dispute over legality ==
Japan has argued that the establishment of the Southern Ocean Whale Sanctuary was in contravention of the International Convention for the Regulation of Whaling (ICRW) on which the IWC is based and is therefore illegal.

This view received strong support from Professor W. T. Burke of the University of Washington in his paper circulated as IWC Document Number IWC/48/33. He refers to Article V(2) of the ICRW, which states that the creation of any sanctuary must "be based on scientific findings" and "take into consideration the interests of the consumers of whale products and the whaling industry".

Prof Burke's interpretation is disputed by Prof Chris Wold of the Northwestern School of Law of Lewis & Clark College, who argued that the IWC must maintain both the conservation and whaling industry objectives of the ICRW. This view is supported by Alexander Gillespie, Professor of Law at the University of Waikato, who reasoned in his 2006 book, Whaling Diplomacy, that phrases such as "best interests of the whaling industry" must now consider commercial non-consumptive use (such as whale watching).

As there is no settlement procedure in the IWC for this type of dispute, Japan has asked the IWC to submit its case to a relevant legal body for analysis. This proposal was rejected by a majority of IWC members.

=== International Court of Justice (ICJ) proceedings ===
On 31 May 2010, the Australian Government lodged formal proceedings against Japan in the International Court of Justice (ICJ) in The Hague, Netherlands. In a joint ministerial statement, the government stated that it "has not taken this decision lightly."

On 5 January 2011, leaked US diplomatic cables revealed that the Australian legal challenge to Japanese whaling was heavily influenced by domestic political pressures and Australian government advisers were left deeply pessimistic about the prospects of success in the International Court. In its reports to Washington, the US Embassy reported that Australian government contacts were stating that the legal proceedings "... would be unlikely to stop the whale hunt entirely, but could well force modifications that would make it more difficult for the Japanese". The Australian public overwhelmingly supports governmental efforts to stop Japanese whaling, even at risk of losing valuable trade relations. The New Zealand government lodged a "Declaration of Intervention" with the ICJ on 6 February 2013, in which it deemed Japan as ineligible for a Special Permit that would allow whaling on the basis of scientific research.

As a result of the Australian government's 2010 application, a court case was heard at the ICJ. The hearing ran from 26 June 2013 until 6 July 2013. In its deposition to the ICJ, the Australian government has claimed that Japan "has breached and is continuing to breach" its obligations under the international convention, and further asserted that Japan has refused to accept International Whaling Commission (IWC) recommendations. Solicitor-General of Australia Justin Gleeson appeared for Australia before the ICJ.

The ICJ's 16-judge bench received and then decided upon the case. Rothwell stated that the case "is a complex one which raises novel legal issues not previously considered by any international court".

Tony Press, CEO of the Antarctic Climate and Ecosystems Cooperative Research Centre at the University of Tasmania, Australia, provided weekly reports of the ICJ hearings for The Conversation Australia media publication. Following the second week, Press relayed that Japan articulated in certain terms its intentions in the Southern Ocean: "the proper conservation of whale stocks and thus make possible the orderly development of the whaling industry", further explaining that a whale must be killed to obtain certain types of information, such as the collection of ear plugs to estimate the age of a whale. During the second week, Professor Lars Walløe, of the University of Oslo and a former Norwegian Commissioner to the Whaling Commission was presented by Japan as its sole expert witness.

During the week beginning 8 July 2013, New Zealand delivered its intervention, in which it provided a history of the origin of the 1946 Whaling Convention and Australian Attorney-General Mark Dreyfus affirmed that his nation had not "colluded" with New Zealand to launch the ICJ proceedings. Dreyfus concluded Australia's contribution by emphasising the friendship shared by Australia and Japan, and stated: "Australia respectfully requests the Court to bring Japan's whaling program to an end."

The ICJ hearing concluded on 16 July 2013. In Japan's final presentation Professor Payam Akhavan of Harvard University stated: "it would not be an exaggeration to say that Australia's case now hangs by a thread".

==== Outcome ====
On 31 March 2014 the ICJ ruled that Japan's JARPA II whaling program "can broadly be characterized as 'scientific research'" but failed to comply with three provisions of the Schedule to the International Convention for the Regulation of Whaling. The Court ordered that "Japan revoke any extant authorization, permit or licence to kill, take or treat whales in relation to JARPA II, and refrain from granting any further permits under Article VIII, paragraph 1, of the Convention, in pursuance of that programme". The court's judges agreed with Australia that the number of Japanese scientific research publications were not proportionate to the number of animals killed. Two former Australian Environment ministers, Peter Garrett and Ian Campbell, among other Australian politicians applauded the decision and stated their hopes that Japan will respect it. The decision of the ICJ is final and the right of appeal does not apply in this context; Japan said it would abide by the decision.
