= Cantus Arcticus =

Orchestral work by Einojuhani Rautavaara

- Concerto for Birds and Orchestra
- by Einojuhani Rautavaara
- The first seven bars of the first movement
- English: Arctic Song
- Opus: 61
- Year: 1972
- Period: Contemporary classical
- Genre: Art music; Biomusic; Musique concrète
- Style: Aleatoric; Neo-tonal
- Occasion: First doctoral conferment ceremony of Oulu University
- Commissioned by: Oulu University
- Dedication: Urho Kekkonen
- Published: 1972: Helsinki
- Publisher: Edition Fazer
- Duration: c. 18:00
- Movements: 3
- Scoring: Experimental
- Instrumental: Orchestra and tape-recorder

Premiere
- Date: 18 October 1972
- Location: Oulu
- Conductor: Stephen Portman
- Performers: Oulu Symphony Orchestra

Cantus Arcticus, also known as Concerto for Birds and Orchestra, is a three-part orchestral work by the Finnish composer Einojuhani Rautavaara that incorporates tape recordings of birdsong.

Commissioned by Oulu University for its first doctoral conferment ceremony, Cantus Arcticus was premiered in Oulu on 18 October 1972 by the Oulu Symphony Orchestra conducted by Stephen Portman. The score was published the same year. The work is dedicated to Urho Kekkonen, who was president of Finland at the time.

Cantus Arcticus has enjoyed wide popularity. The reasons cited include the work's resemblance to familiar tonal music; the way it links music with nature by using recorded birdsong; the novelty of combining such recordings with a live orchestra; and its association with an idealised and exoticised version of Finland's culture and landscape. The work's appeal is also shown by its use in other musical contexts, including jazz compositions and film music.

== Composition ==
=== Orchestral work ===
In 1971, Oulu University commissioned Rautavaara to write a cantata for performance at its first doctoral conferment ceremony the following year. The university library sent literature about the Oulu region to the composer, but no text appealed to him, and the choir that was due to take part was "overworked and not in good vocal trim": this led him to use recordings of birdsong instead of human voices.

Rautavaara copied some of the bird sounds heard in Cantus Arcticus from the sound-effects collection of Finnish Radio. He also visited the wetlands of Liminka Bay in northern Finland to record the sounds of cranes and other birds directly. The performance tape was assembled from these sources at the composer's home using two tape-recorders, and Cantus Arcticus was completed on 13 March 1972.

=== Piano transcription ===
Cantus Arcticus: Duet for Birds and Piano, a transcription arranged by the pianist Peter Lönnqvist, was published in 2017 accompanied by downloadable recordings of the birdsong to be used in its performance.

== Instrumentation ==
The score specifies the following orchestra:

Woodwinds
Flutes (2), oboes (2), clarinets in B♭ (2), bassoons (2).
Brass
French horns in F (2), trumpets in B (2), trombone.
Percussion/keyboard
Timpani, (Note: May be omitted ("ad lib.")) cymbals, tam-tam, celesta.
Strings (Note: Detailed in the score itself.)
Violins, violas, cellos, double basses, harp.
Electroacoustic
Tape-recorder with 2 channels. (Note: Allowing the performer to switch between two audio sources or to play back both at the same time.)

== Structure and content ==
Cantus Arcticus has three movements: The Bog, (Note: Also referred to by the composer as The Marsh.) Melancholy, and Swans Migrating.

=== The Bog ===
The opening bar of the first movement is labelled "Think of autumn and of Tchaikovsky". Evoking an atmosphere in this way, rather than referring to a narrative, is a feature of many of Rautavaara's works.

The movement begins with a solo for two flutes played at a moderate andante tempo. The flutes follow each other in a birdsong-like melody, with the theme based on a chromatic scale.

First figuration in flutes' solo

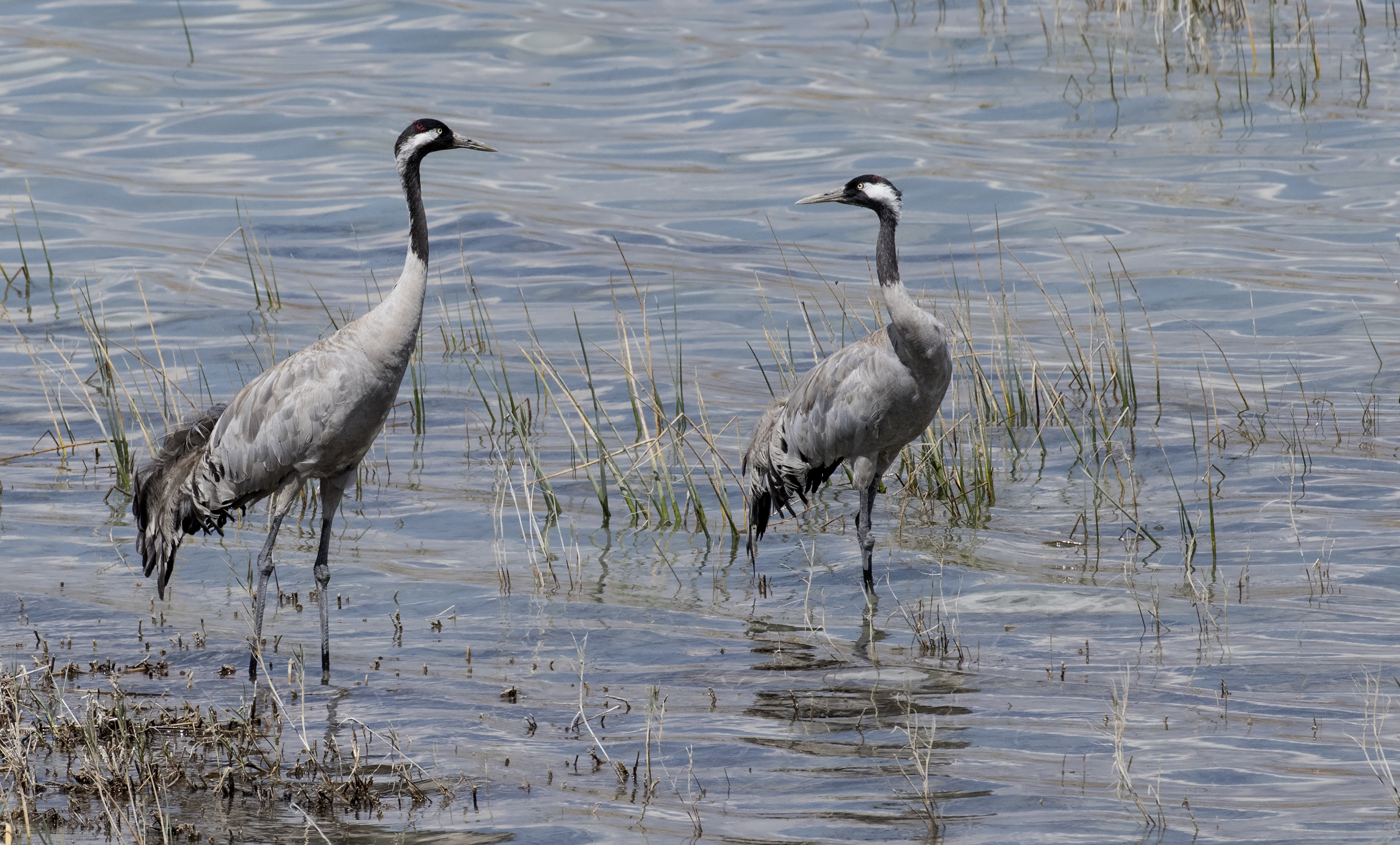
Common Crane

The recorded birdsong forms the leading voice towards the end of the solo, and becomes louder as the woodwinds enter: these also imitate the sounds of birds. The muted trombone, entering just after the woodwinds, is instructed to "Try to imitate the staccato sound of the crane heard later on the tape". The score states that while the sequence of instruments and the repeated group of notes played in this section "must be as written", the conductor can decide the intervals between them.

Next, the first bassoon and cello enter with a lyrical, melancholic theme that, according to the composer, "might be interpreted as the voice and mood of a person walking in the wilds". This reaches a crescendo with the full orchestra before taken forward by the cellos.

Bassoon and cello theme

At the very end of the movement, the clarinet plays a variant of the flutes' solo from the opening bars: this creates symmetry in the movement by building a bridge back to its beginning. The conductor can choose when the tape-recording, the clarinet, and the strings stop, and whether the music concludes in B or F.

=== Melancholy ===
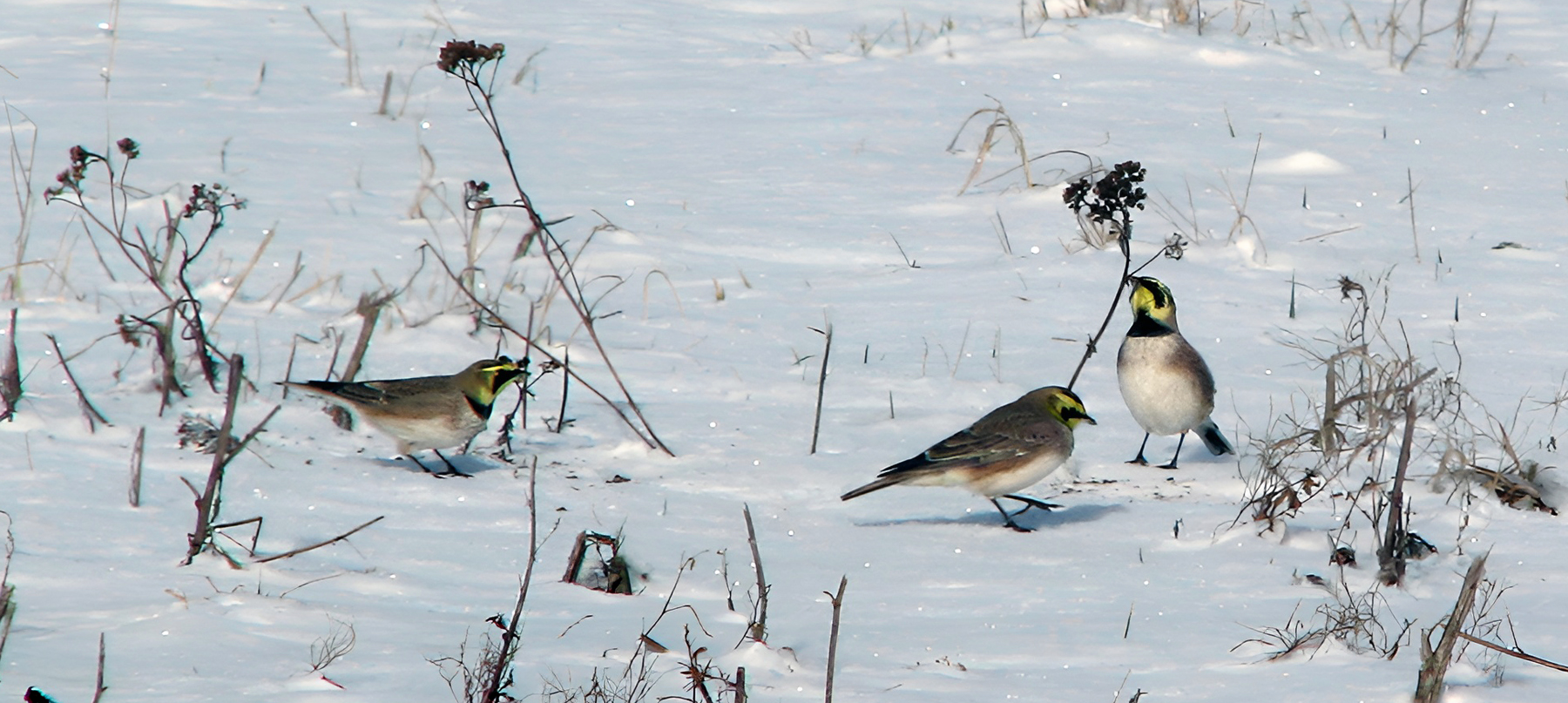
Shore larks

According to the score at the start of the second movement, "The orchestra pauses, giving the audience time to notice that the birds on channels 1 and 2 are imitating each other". The bird featured is a shore lark, and, states the composer, its song has been slowed to lower the pitch by two octaves, making it a "ghost bird" and he himself a "creative ornithologist".

After about a minute, the violins lead the strings – all muted – in a series of ascending, falling, and constantly changing chords centred on A minor. The woodwinds enter soon after, and are joined by the brass in a crescendo before the music dies away.

Opening sequence by violins

The use of muted strings, the paucity of expression markings within the score, and the lack of brass and percussion for most of the movement, all contribute to evoking "coldness, or an open location, that channels into a larger expression of melancholy".

=== Swans Migrating ===
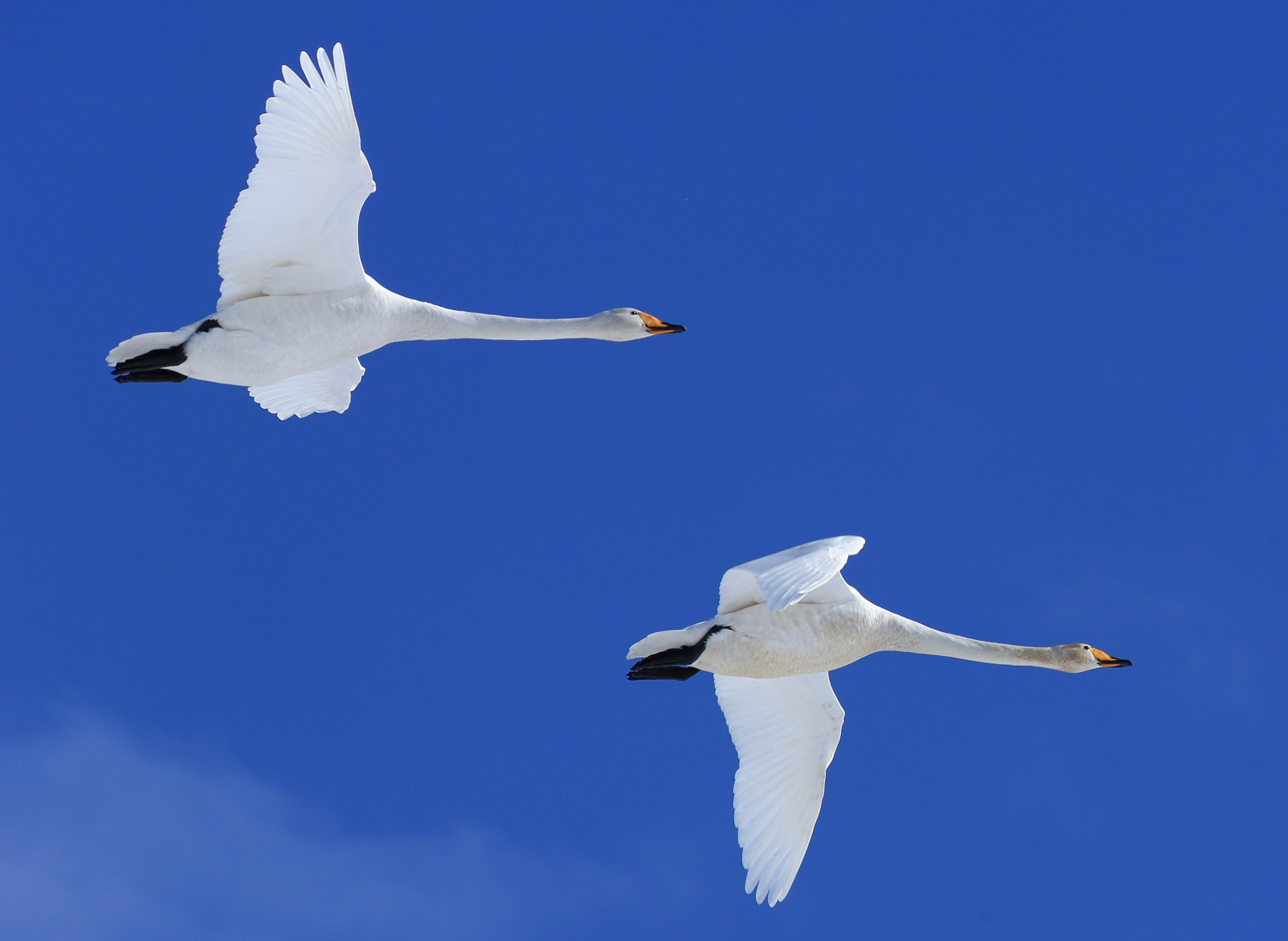
Whooper swans

In the third movement, the orchestra divides into four groups: I in the score refers to the violins and violas; the woodwinds are II; horns, cellos and double basses, III; and IV contains the harp and celesta. The score states that these groups "are mutually synchronized only when so indicated", giving the movement an aleatory flavour.

The recorded sound of whooper swans begins the movement, and continues till its end. After half a minute or so, the strings (group I) join the swans, playing regular, gradually swelling chords that herald the entry of II's clarinet and flute. These play the same melody that the flute duo opened the first movement with, helping bind the three-part work into a whole.

More woodwinds join the repetitive, birdsong-like figurations, which then combine with a theme performed by III, introduced by the horns. The harp and celesta (IV) join soon after, and the orchestra becomes more synchronised from this point on. The overall effect has been compared to "the fluid motion of one mass ... made up of separate parts, resembling birds in flight", with the four groups "[occupying] the same space, overlapping without colliding – coordinated, but not perfectly in synch".

Theme introduced by solo horns

The theme is repeated five times, with the trombone imitating the swans during the last repetition. A crescendo near the end creates the impression of an ever-increasing number of birds: as the composer puts it, "[T]he swans' trumpeting turns into crazy glissandos – I imagined them flying straight into the scorching sun ...". (Note: In the original: "Orkesterimusiikin kulminoituessa voimakkaimmilleen muuttuu joutsenten toitotus mielettömiksi glissandoiksi – kuvittelin että ne lentäisivät suoraan polttavaan aurinkoon asti ...".) The piece concludes with a modified, descending version of the theme as the sounds of swans and orchestra slowly fade away.

== Stylistic contexts ==
=== Neoromanticism and neo-tonality ===
Rautavaara composed Cantus Arcticus during his neoromantic period. This stretched from the late 1960s to the mid-1970s, and followed a stage when he had favoured twelve-tone serialism (dodecaphony) in his compositions, like most Finnish composers of the time. Cantus Arcticus appeared as the wave of musical modernism that arose in Finland after World War II receded, and an interest by composers in neo-tonality emerged.

Rautavaara's neoromantic works have been described as the outcome of a continuation, within a newly adopted neotonal framework, of a process of stylistic exploration. The works immediately preceding Cantus Arcticus (1972) share its experimental nature: they include Apollo contra Marsyas (1970), a jazzy, musicals-inspired comic opera; True & False Unicorn (1971), a cantata with elements from jazz and spirituals that features a collage of national anthems; and Vigilia (1972), a version of Finnish Orthodox Church music.

=== Aleatoricism ===
Cantus Arcticus has also been grouped with works where Rautavaara, after breaking with dodecaphony, experimented with tightly controlled aleatoric techniques. These include Garden of Spaces (1971), (Note: Originally known as Regular Sets of Elements in a Semiregular Situation, where "The units of music [are] regular, precisely notated, but their action, position and function in the overall structure [are] free.") and Hommage à Zoltán Kodály (Bird Gardens) (1982).

=== Pre-recorded sounds and birdsong ===
Compositions using pre-recorded sounds provide a further context. Rautavaara had first used tape-recordings in True & False Unicorn (1971), and went on to use tape in three operas – The Abduction of the Sampo (1974), Vincent (1990) and The House of the Sun (1990) – as well as in several short pieces of commissioned electronic music. Tape became a trend among composers in the 1970s, though employing the sounds of animals was uncommon:a rare example from this period is And God Created Great Whales (1970) by Alan Hovhaness, which features recorded whale songs.

The only prior example of an orchestral work requiring recorded birdsong is thought to be the tone-poem Pines of Rome (1924) by Ottorino Respighi, where the end of the third movement is scored for a brief phonographic recording of a nightingale.

== Reception ==
=== Initial reception ===
The first review of Cantus Arcticus appeared in Helsingin Sanomat, a Finnish newspaper of record, shortly after the premiere in Oulu in 1972, and drew a comparison with Rautavaara's Vigilia:

[S]omething is still missing; perhaps a greater contrast between the different parts, or also the deeper development of each of them. Much more could have been made of the birds' part, in particular by electronic means, but perhaps Rautavaara does not feel this method is familiar enough to him. It is also difficult to avoid an association with American widescreen cinema. A good commissioned work, ... but not a landmark in Rautavaara's output – and far away, at least, from the magnificently inspired Vigilia.

Commenting on the first performance in Finland's capital, Helsinki, three years later, a reviewer from the same newspaper noted that Cantus Arcticus was "downright modern in its style but remarkably timeless in its expression", (Note: "... suorastaan moderni mutta ilmaisultaan merkillisen ajaton ...") described the work as containing a "mystical, slightly repressed, perhaps even pessimistic train of thought", (Note: ... sen sisältämiä mystisvoittoisia, hieman sisäänpäinkääntyneitä, ehkä osaksi pessimistisiakin ajatuskulkuja ...") and praised its "delicate, colourful and expressive soundscape". (Note: "... sen herkasta, värikkäästä ja ilmeikkäästä sointiasusta.")

The first commercial recording, on vinyl, was released in 1981 by Finlandia Records. In its review, The New York Times said:

"Cantus Arcticus" ... is a markedly different concerto – indeed, it is doubtful that there exists any precedent for this strange and exhilarating composition. Mr. Rautavaara describes it as a "concerto for birds and orchestra," and he has combined woodwind chirps and spare, slate-gray melodies with the actual recorded cries of northern birds into a captivating three-movement composition.

The work was lauded as an example of "wilderness music" in a 1988 article on this topic in a journal of radical environmentalism.

=== Later reviews ===
Cantus Arcticus was described as "an instant crowd-pleaser" in an overview of the composer's orchestral music published in 1999, and a reviewer of a recording released the same year called it "gratifyingly melodic ... provid[ing] pleasant, comfortable listening, very much like tasteful, high-quality background music written to accompany a travelogue." In a 2002 analysis of Rautavaara's output, a musicologist referred to Cantus Arcticus as one of his "most popular, although hardly artistically most significant works", while a concert review in 2007 commented that "many deride [Cantus Arcticus] as easy-listening fluff". Another referred to it as "essentially a tone-poem in the Sibelius mould."

Regarding the incorporation of taped birdsong in the composition, a concert reviewer in 2000 wrote that "Mr. Rautavaara's tape manipulations are fascinating, especially in the haunting canon of the second movement ... But it came to the fore beautifully elsewhere, lending a human connection to this evocation of a landscape ... ". One in 2007 described the birdsong as "an all-too-obvious mask for the music's banality", and another in 2015 stated that "the effect of the disjuncture between the birds’ aural presence and their absence, there-but-not-there, was slightly surreal [and] sometimes less mystic than disconcerting." A reviewer in 2017 found the taped birdsong "rather dated" and "at one point ... unintentionally humorous".

=== Appeal and popularity ===
According to Otonkoski (1994), the appeal of Cantus Arcticus derives from three factors. First, the piece has no "internal dissension": the musical building-blocks are not put into confrontation or conflict with each other. Second, there are no significant "hidden structures": the work is transparent, "lean and sinewy". And lastly, Otonkoski notes the repetitions of "hymn-like" themes in the first and third movements: in his view, these operate like a "hypnotic liturgy".

Burton (2022) suggests that the perception of Cantus Arcticus as a "Finnish" piece has played an important part in its international popularity, and links "Finnishness" to the concept of national exoticism – an idealised notion of Finland – and thence to Bohlman's (2017) theory of the attraction of musical Borealism – an aspect of an exoticised view of "The North". As examples of the work's exoticisation, Burton points to its inclusion in compilation albums presenting an idealised North, instancing Aurora Borealis: Magic of the Mysterious North and Aurora: Music of the Northern Lights. He also refers to a popular guide to classical music where Cantus Arcticus is described as a "mysterious and exotic sound-world, with the birdcalls emerging and disappearing in the sombre half-light of Rautavaara's orchestral landscapes."

== Recordings ==
Recordings of the work, in whole or part, have been released on the BIS, Deutsche Grammophon, Finlandia, Naxos, Ondine, and Warner Classics labels. Conductors have included Neeme Järvi, Hannu Lintu, Max Pommer, Leif Segerstam, and Osmo Vänskä directing the Helsinki Philharmonic, Royal Scottish National, and Leipzig Radio Symphony orchestras, among others. When Rautavaara was asked, in a 1996 interview, "Is there such a thing as a perfect performance?", he replied:

I like different points of view, different aspects on the same work. I'm happy that there are very different performances which I like, so in that sense there is no perfect performance. For instance, Cantus Arcticus, the Concerto for Birds and Orchestra, has been recorded many, many times, and the recording in Ondine by Pommer is very, very good indeed. I like it very much. But there is also a recording by BIS, the Swedish company, where the birds really are a soloist of the concerto. They are much more in foreground, so it sounds really different, entirely different in the basic attitude to the music. And that I love very much, too!

In a 2017 podcast, a panel of music critics convened by France Musique reviewed several recordings (and a broadcast performance) of Cantus Arcticus, and ranked them on the basis of listeners' votes.

== Performances ==
Music festivals that have featured Cantus Arcticus include one in Japan in 1992 organised by Izumi Tateno; a Scandinavian music festival in Berlin in 1998 organised by Vladimir Ashkenazy; the first Hampstead & Highgate Festival in London, in 1999; a 2002 "Rautavaara & Franck" festival in Helsinki; Estonia's 2015 Nargenfestival; 2017's Sydney Festival; the 2019 Festival de Pâques [Easter Festival] in Aix-en-Provence; the BBC Proms in 2008 and 2021; and the 2023 Colorado Music Festival.

== Interpretations ==
=== Dance ===
Viacheslav Samodurov, artistic director of the Yekaterinburg Ballet Company, choreographed Cantus Arcticus in 2013. The Financial Times described its performance at the 2014 Golden Mask Festival in Moscow as "wittily neoclassical". In 2017, the dancer and choreographer Virpi Pahkinen choreographed Cantus Arcticus for performance by the Finnish National Ballet company at the Finnish National Opera in Helsinki.

=== Installation art ===
In 2013, Bruce Munro, an installation artist, created a work of light art, based on fibre optics, inspired by Cantus Arcticus. Commissioned by the Rothschild Foundation, it was installed in the former coach house of Waddesdon Manor, an English country house, for three years.

=== Music ===
Cantus Arcticus in the Michael Wollny Trio's jazz album Oslo, released in 2018, expands several figurations of the original. On Aki Rissanen's 2019 album Art in Motion, an interpretation of the original's second movement, Melancholy, was described as "alternat[ing] between ghostly open chords and the sort of knotty jazz lyricism you’d expect from Keith Jarrett."

Swans Migrating, the third movement of Cantus Arcticus, is part of the soundtrack of the film To the Wonder (2012), an avant-garde romance directed by Terrence Malick. It accompanies a tense scene between two of the principal characters followed by a romantic flashback.

== See also ==
- Aleatoric music – Music in which some element of the composition is left to chance
- Biomusic – Form of experimental music
- Birdsong in music – Role of birdsong in Western music
- Borealism – Form of exoticism imposed on the North
- Contemporary Finnish art music – Modernist, post-modernist, and neo-classical
- Einojuhani Rautavaara – Finnish composer (1928–2016)
