= Songs of the Humpback Whale =

Songs of the Humpback Whale may refer to

- Whale vocalization, sounds are used by whales for different kinds of communication
- Songs of the Humpback Whale (album), a 1970 album produced by bio-acoustician Roger Payne
- Songs of the Humpback Whale (novel), a 1992 novel by Jodi Picoult
