= Biomusic =

Form of experimental music

Biomusic is a form of experimental music which deals with sounds created or performed by non-humans. The definition is also sometimes extended to include sounds made by humans in a directly biological way. For instance, music that is created by the brain waves of the composer can also be called biomusic as can music created by the human body without the use of tools or instruments that are not part of the body (singing or vocalizing is usually excluded from this definition).

Biomusic can be divided into two basic categories: music that is created solely by the animal (or in some cases plant), and music which is based upon animal noises but which is arranged by a human composer. Some forms of music use recorded sounds of nature as part of the music, for example new-age music uses the nature sounds as backgrounds for various musical soundscapes, and ambient music sometimes uses nature sounds modified with reverbs and delay units to make spacey versions of the nature sounds as part of the ambience.

== Biophony ==
At the 2014 Cheltenham Music Festival (UK), "The Great Animal Orchestra Symphony for Orchestra and Wild Soundscapes," composed by Bernie Krause and Oxford (Balliol College) former composer-in-residence, Richard Blackford, premiered, and was performed by the BBC National Orchestra of Wales. This composition is the first symphony based on ecological themes and the first to perform, live, with whole natural soundscapes informing the orchestral form and themes, just as biophonies and geophonies inspired music (rhythm, melody, organization of sound, timbre, and dynamic) at the dawn of cultural time. Commissioned by the Alonzo King LINES Ballet, an international corps based in San Francisco, the score for Biophony, composed by Bernie Krause and Richard Blackford, consists almost entirely of biophonies and geophonies and premiered in 2015. It has since been performed worldwide.

== Bird song ==
The incorporation of bird song in music is one of the most widely studied forms of biomusic. Notable in this regard is the French composer Olivier Messiaen who began incorporating accurately transcribed bird songs into his music in 1952. One obstacle facing the use of bird songs in music is their complexity and usually very high register. Nevertheless, Messiaen included a variety of bird songs in many of his mature works including his Catalogue d'oiseaux ("Birds catalogue"), piano (1956–1958) which incorporated songs from thirteen different birds. Also, he incorporated the themes of many birds in his orchestral piece, "Chronochromie".

In Western art music, recordings of bird songs have been used in numerous works. One of the first is Pines of Rome (1924) by Ottorino Respighi – the third movement includes the sound of a nightingale recorded onto a phonograph, played in the concert hall during the movement's ending. This use of recording technology was something that had never been done before, and it quickly generated discussion. A famous example of this technique can be found in Cantus Arcticus (1972) by the Finnish composer Einojuhani Rautavaara: subtitled Concerto for Birds and Orchestra, this piece incorporates tape recordings of birdsong recorded near the Arctic Circle and on the bogs of Liminka in northern Finland.

Birdsong also frequently features in popular music. Early examples include schlager singer Ulla Billquist's När Svalorna Komma Och Bygga Sitt Bo (1932) and Tobourlika by rebetiko artists Stratos Pagioumtzis and Ioanna Georgakopoulou (1940). A nightingale can be heard on Pink Floyd's "Cirrus Minor" (More, 1969) or "Grantchester Meadows" (Ummagumma, 1969), tweeting birds on Laurie Anderson's "O Superman" (1981), seagulls in Léo Ferré‘s L'Opéra du pauvre (1983). Thanks to its inclusion as a preset in the E-mu Emulator II, a specific sample of a loon, notably heard in Sueño Latino (1989) and in 808 State's Pacific State (1989), has become a recurring motif in electronic-based popular music.

The entire biophony of a soundscape can be heard on the Beaver & Krause 1968 Warner Brothers album (released in 1970), In a Wild Sanctuary, one of the first notable ecology-themed popular albums and the first album to incorporate entire natural soundscapes as components of the orchestration.

Of the more than 13,100 bird species, fewer than 100 have been accepted into Western classical or other music genres (or 0.007%). With the exception of entire biophonies, the abstract and deconstructed selection of particular birds (and the voices of a few other non-human animals such as certain cetaceans or canids) in these genres have been largely predicated on the convenient ways in which they happen to fit the models consistent with the then-current paradigms – those considered to be "musical" at any given time.

== Whale song in music ==
Recorded whale song also frequently inspired 20th century experimental music. One example is in George Crumb's Vox Balaenae (Voice of the Whale), a composition for electric flute, electric cello, and amplified piano. However, as Vox Balaenae does not include actual recorded whale songs, it is not a pure biomusic composition. Another similar piece that could be considered true biomusic is And God Created Great Whales, a piece written in 1970 by American composer Alan Hovhaness. This work for orchestra and whale songs brings the recorded sounds of humpback, bowhead, and killer whales directly into the concert hall. The song "Il n'y a plus rien", from French singer-songwriter Léo Ferré's eponymous album (1973), begins and ends with recorded whale songs mixed with a symphonic orchestra. Another piece utilizing recorded whale song is the Earth Mass (Missa Gaia) by Paul Winter (1982) which is performed at the Episcopal Church of St. John the Divine each year to celebrate the Feast of St. Francis. One of the movements uses a four note motive derived from a recorded humpback whale song that opens and closes that segment of the work.

== Neurofeedback ==
Music created by neurofeedback relies on the brainwaves of a human subject to create music. An Electroencephalophone (a musical instrument that converts brain waves to sound) was first designed by Erkki Kurenniemi in the 1960s. American composer David Rosenboom further pioneered work with neurofeedback music as has Brazilian composer Eduardo Reck Miranda. Neurofeedback composition is still in development, and though it is widely experimented with, it is still very uncommon to see it performed.

== Cybernetic biomusic ==
In 1975, Grateful Dead associate Ned Lagin released an album of experimental space music entitled Seastones on Round Records; he described the recording as "cybernetic biomusic", emphasizing the use of computers and synthesizers to create organic-impressionistic sounds and meditative feelings. The album was one of the first commercially released recordings to feature digital computers and the Buchla digital-polyphonic synthesizer.

From 2004 to 2007, Pete Townshend collaborated with composer Lawrence Ball and programmer Dave Snowdon to set up a project called The Lifehouse Method, an Internet site where applicants could "sit" for an electronic musical portrait made up from data they entered into the website. On 23 April 2007, Ball released a double album on iTunes called Method Music - Imaginary Sitters, Imaginary Galaxies which is part of Pete Townshend's Lifehouse Method music project.

== Other examples ==
Biomusic can take many other forms. These can include the simple amplification of animal sounds, or the creation of music through the fluctuation of electric current in plants. More unusual still is the use of animal notation: music scores created by animals, often in the form of paw prints. Biomusic can also take the form of animals trained to perform specific behaviors as part of a musical performance (birds trained to sing for instance).

Music from The Body is the biomusic soundtrack album to Roy Battersby's 1970 documentary film The Body, about human biology, narrated by Vanessa Redgrave and Frank Finlay. The music was composed and performed in collaboration between Pink Floyd member Roger Waters and Ron Geesin, and uses sounds made by the human body (slaps, breathing, laughing, whispering, farts, etc.) in addition to more traditional guitar, piano and stringed instruments.

The experimental ambient/noise group Tribes of Neurot released an album titled Adaptation and Survival: The Insect Project in 2002; a multidirectional sound experiment in which all sounds were originally produced by insects and then manipulated and synthesized.

A collaboration album between Breakcore artists Venetian Snares and Hecate entitled Nymphomatriarch was composed entirely from sounds of the two performing various sexual activities together, which were distorted and time-stretched to resemble typical Breakcore samples.

The Lake, by artist Julie Freeman tracked natural biological motion via electronic tagging systems, and transformed the data collected into musical composition and animation.

Musicians Caninus, Hatebeak and Lil B have used animals as lead or backing vocalists.

"Field recorder" Stuart Hyatt has used sounds created by bats which were then combined with music.

== See also ==
- 20th-century classical music
- Aleatoricism
- Avant-garde
- Biomusicology
- Contemporary music
- Music and sleep
- New-age music
- Sound map
- Zoomusicology

== Bibliography ==
- Baptista, L. Gray, P. M. Krause, B. et al. The Music of Nature and the Nature of Music. Science: January 5, 2001.
- Cope, David Techniques of the Contemporary Composer (ISBN 0-02-864737-8)
- Krause, Bernie. The Great Animal Orchestra: Finding the Origins of Music in the World's Wild Places. (Little Brown, March, 1012)
