= The Voyage of the Odyssey =

Oceanographic research program

- Mission statement: A Pioneering Global Research Voyage to Collect Baseline Data on Contaminants in the World’s Oceans
- Location: Global
- Key people: Dr. Roger Payne, Dr. Iain Kerr, Captain Bob Wallace, Genevieve Johnson, Chris Johnson
- Website: whale.org/voo

The Voyage of the Odyssey was a five-year program conducted by oceanographic research and education non-profit Ocean Alliance, which collected the first baseline data set on contaminants in the world’s oceans. It was launched from San Diego in March 2000, and ended five and a half years later in Boston, August 2005.

In a 1979 National Geographic magazine article Ocean Alliance founder and president Dr. Roger Payne predicted that toxic pollution would replace the harpoon as the next greatest threat to whales. Recognizing the stark lack of data on the subject, Roger set his organisation Ocean Alliance with the task of obtaining a global baseline data set on contaminants.

After years of planning and fund-raising, the program was finally ready to launch in 2000. In the executive summary of the project, Roger stated that, "The Voyage of the Odyssey has proven irrefutably that ocean life is becoming polluted to unacceptable levels by metals and human-made contaminants."

The focus of the program was on sperm whales, a cosmopolitan species found in every major ocean. As long-lived apex predators, sperm whales represent a useful bioindicator of health in the marine ecosystem in a toxicological context, owing to the effects of three key processes: bioaccumulation, biomagnification and the generation effect. These three processes also make sperm whales, and other apex predators, at great risk from toxic pollution. As mammalian apex predators that nurse their young with milk, they are also relatively similar to us, and thus are seen as the ‘canaries in the coal mine’ regarding humanity's relationship with the oceans.

The program also had a robust educational and outreach component. In every country they visited, Odyssey crew members met with government leaders, students, teachers and journalists-many of whom kept promoting ocean health after the Odyssey departed for its next research location. The program was also the focus of a major online diary and educational webseries through American broadcaster PBS produced by Genevieve & Chris Johnson.

Aside from collecting the first baseline data set on contaminants in the world’s oceans, the program was witness to a number of other successes, innovations and firsts. These include:

- uncovering illegal shark finning operations
- documenting the use of massive drift nets in the Mediterranean
- helping to create a 1.2 million square-mile marine mammal sanctuary in Papua New Guinea waters
- made incredibly rare sightings of a live Longman’s beaked whale
