= Julie Freeman =

Julie Freeman may refer to:

- Julie Freeman (artist)
- Julie Freeman (politician)
- Julie Freeman (baseball)

== See also ==
- Julia Freeman (disambiguation)
