= And God Created Great Whales =

Composition by Alan Hovhaness

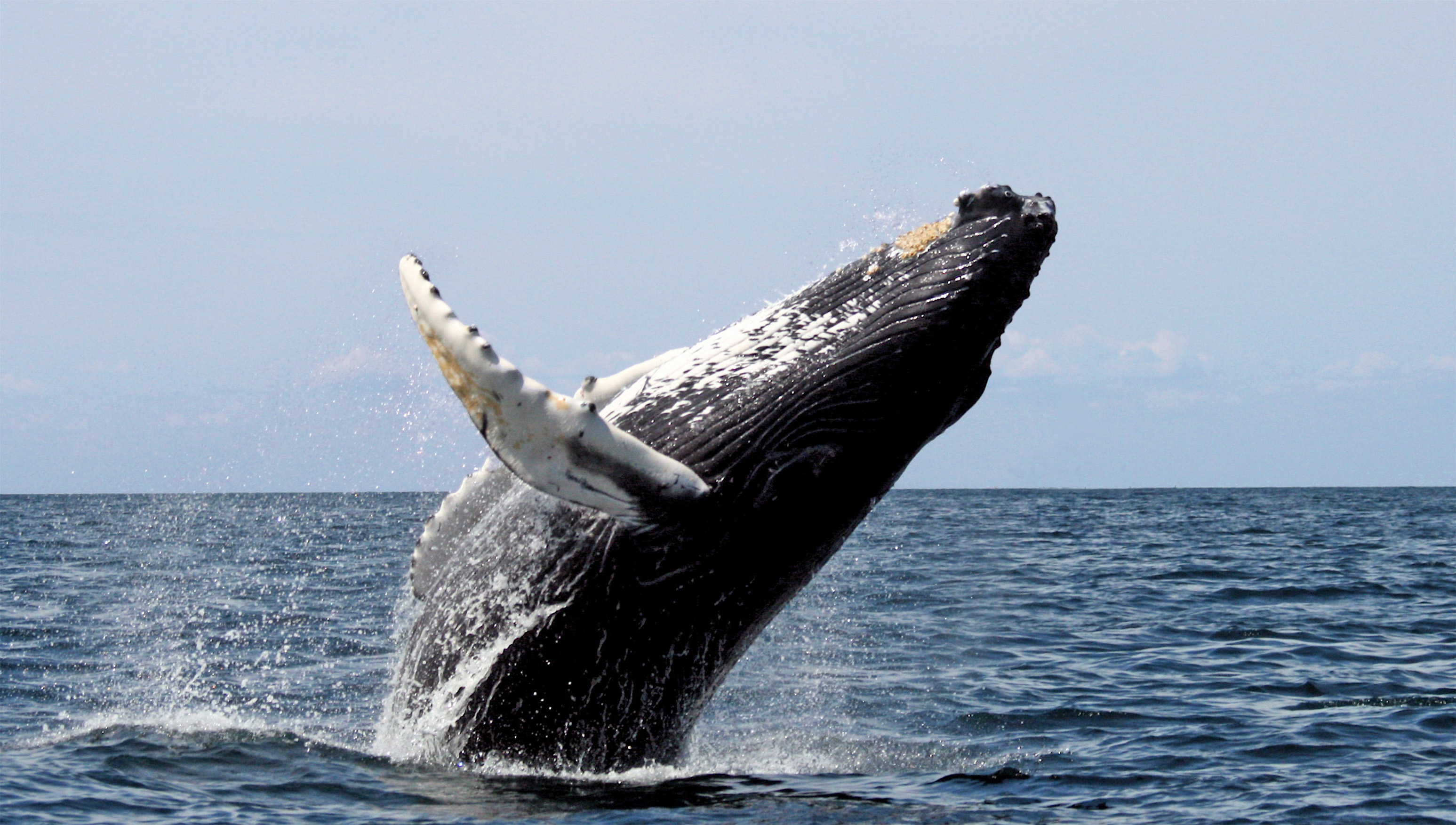
And God Created Great Whales features recorded whale sounds of bowhead and humpback whales.

And God Created Great Whales, Op. 229, No. 1, is a symphonic poem for orchestra and recorded whale sounds by the American composer Alan Hovhaness. The work was commissioned by Andre Kostelanetz and the New York Philharmonic, who premiered the piece on June 11, 1970, in New York City. The piece has been recorded numerous times and remains one of Hovhaness's most popular compositions. It has also been credited as an early work in the movement to save whales from extinction, alongside John Tavener's 1966 cantata The Whale. The title of the work comes from Genesis 1:21 in the King James Version of the Bible.

== Style and composition ==
The music contains elements of melodic pentatonicism and asynchronous aleatoricism, which Hovhaness referred to as "free non-rhythm chaos." Specially recorded whale vocalizations play intermittently throughout the work and include the songs of humpback whales and bowhead whales. The whale recordings were done by Roger Payne and Frank Watlington, from the album Songs of the Humpback Whale.

== Reception ==
Larry Rohter of The New York Times said the piece "can veer toward kitsch." Edward Greenfield of Gramophone similarly gave the work mixed praise, stating:

With its fluent use of gimmicks, it would be easy to mock this, starting as it does with an aleatory twitter which leads on to pentatonic doodling of a kind that one improvised as a child on the black keys of the piano. Then comes the first of the tapes of the songs of the great humpback whale, recorded specially, followed by the first huge climax, very impressive except that the pentatonic melody which roars out on trombones (leading to whale-song imitations) is not distinctive enough, almost banal, punctuated by glockenspiel.

== See also ==
- List of compositions by Alan Hovhaness
- Biomusic

== Sources ==
- Morrison, Chris (2005). Woodstra, Chris; Brennan, Gerald; Schrott, Allen (eds.). All Music Guide to Classical Music: The Definitive Guide to Classical Music. Backbeat Books. ISBN 0879308656.
