= Ocean Alliance =

American cetacean conservation non-profit

- Formation: 1971; 55 years ago
- Founder: Dr. Roger Payne
- Type: Nonprofit
- Tax ID no.: 22-2573677
- Legal status: 501(c)(3)
- Purpose: Ocean and whale conservation
- Headquarters: Gloucester, Massachusetts
- Location: 32 Horton Street, Gloucester, Massachusetts, 01930
- Board Chair: Andrew Morse
- CEO: Dr. Iain Kerr
- Website: https://whale.org/

Ocean Alliance, Inc., is a 501(c)(3) organization founded in 1971 as one of the world's first organizations dedicated to cetacean (whales, dolphins, and porpoises) conservation. The organization is headquartered in the iconic Tarr & Wonson Paint Manufactory building in Gloucester, Massachusetts, USA. Ocean Alliance's mission is to protect whales and their ocean environment through research, scientific collaboration, education, and the arts. They use drone technology to advance whale science, particularly through their SnotBot® program.

== History ==
Ocean Alliance was founded in 1971 by whale biologist Roger Payne, with the purpose of saving the great whales from the extinction risk posed by commercial whaling. Payne, along with colleague Scott McVay, discovered that humpback whales sing songs, which made him an influential figure in the worldwide campaign to end commercial whaling.

Since its founding under Payne, and later under the stewardship of CEO Iain Kerr, Ocean Alliance has been an important group in the worldwide effort to research and protect whales.

They developed benign research techniques, helping to develop several key research tools for studying whales that are still in use, such as photo-identification and bio-acoustics. Many of their exploits have brought them into the public eye, leading Payne to describe the group as "the group you don't know you know".

During the 1990s, Ocean Alliance established that whales could be saved by publicizing them to the world, and they became involved in over forty documentaries including In the Company of Whales and the IMAX film Whales.

In the late 1990s, Ocean Alliance became increasingly concerned about pollution in our oceans, and how little was being done to study this pollution and bring it to light. From 2000 to 2005, under the leadership of Iain Kerr, Ocean Alliance launched the Voyage of the Odyssey, which provided the first global data set on ocean pollution. This project lasted five years and spanned the entire planet. In its executive summary, Roger Payne stated that, "The Voyage of the Odyssey has proven irrefutably that ocean life is becoming polluted to unacceptable levels by metals and human-made contaminants."

In 2010 the Deepwater Horizon oil rig exploded, releasing approximately 5 million barrels of oil into the Gulf of Mexico. In response, Ocean Alliance spent five years in the Gulf of Mexico, studying the impacts of the oil spill on marine life. This work culminated in the publication of dozens of academic papers and reports.

In 2013, Kerr recognized an emerging technology that could hold the key to the future of whale research and conservation: drones. This marked a shift in Ocean Alliance's approach to whale conservation, as they focused their efforts on facilitating and accelerating the use of drones in whale science. This was carried out under the belief that drones have great potential in whale science and conservation.

Since then, drones have become increasingly common tools in whale science. Ocean Alliance's SnotBot program, and more recently their tagging program, have been at the forefront of this drone emergence.

== Accomplishments ==
- 1967: Ocean Alliance founder and president Roger Payne discovered, along with Scott McVay, that humpback whales sing songs. This was an important hallmark of the Save the Whales movement.
- 1970s: Payne and Ocean Alliance demonstrated mathematically that the songs of Blue whales and Fin whales are audible across entire ocean basins. The recent corroboration of this theory may explain, for the first time, why these species have no known breeding grounds.
- 1970s: Payne and Ocean Alliance were instrumental in establishing an 860 square mile whale park (Golfo San Jose), off Peninsula Valdes in southern Argentina-an important breeding ground for endangered Southern right whales. This led to a permanent research program being set up, which is now the longest continuously running study on baleen whales (the program entered its 44th year in 2013). Since 1996 the program has been run in conjunction with the Instituto de Conservación de Ballenas.
- 1970s: Ocean Alliance scientists pioneered many of the benign research techniques commonly used worldwide to study free-ranging whales.
- 1979, National Geographic magazine published an article by Payne which included a sound sheet of his ‘Songs of the Humpback Whale’.
- 1984–1989: Payne was selected for a 'Genius Grant' through the MacArthur Fellows Program.
- 1990s–2020s: An education drive was implemented by Iain Kerr to support Ocean Alliance's programs. This included partnerships with schools in Massachusetts developing an elementary whale study curriculum ‘Looking at Whales’, the Cetacean Education Through Awareness (CETA) program in Gloucester, Massachusetts; the ‘Education Today’ program developed in partnership with the Discovery Channel, the Pacific Life WHALE Education program with various schools across the United States and the Ocean Encounters multimedia education program.
- 1990s–2020s: Ocean Alliance have been involved in the production of over 40 documentaries studying whales, including 'In the Company of Whales' and the IMAX film Whales. Their research vessel Odyssey has been featured on PBS, National Geographic, Discovery Channel, BBC, Canal Plus, NHK, Network Ten Australia, Australian Broadcasting Corporation, Television New Zealand and many others.
- 1970's–2000s: Ocean Alliance was involved in setting up and protecting marine parks in Hawaii, Alaska, Sri Lanka, the Galapagos Islands, Colombia, Costa Rica and Mexico. In 2003, Ocean Alliance's work lead directly to a 1.2 million square mile marine mammal sanctuary being created in the waters of Papua New Guinea.
- 1994: Massachusetts governor William Weld signed a proclamation establishing April 21 as Roger Payne and Ocean Alliance day in celebration of Earth Day.
- 2000–2005: Under CEO Iain Kerr, Ocean Alliance launched 'the Voyage of the Odyssey', to gather the first ever data set on pollutants throughout the world's oceans. This was a massive undertaking, receiving media attention worldwide.
- 2008: Bought the Tarr & Wonson Paint Manufactory in Gloucester, Massachusetts to be its new headquarters.
- 2010–2014: Ocean Alliance spent five summers in the Gulf of Mexico in an attempt to determine the long-term toxicological impacts of the 2010 Deepwater Horizon oil spill.
- 2015: Ocean Alliance 'Drones for Whale Research initiative began after a successful KickStarter campaign. The program, with the flagship 'SnotBot' program at its core, became Ocean Alliance's primary research activity.
- Ocean Alliance's SnotBot and Drones for Whale Research programs continue, as Ocean Alliance becomes a leader in the utilization of drone technology in whale science and conservation. The work was featured in two BBC documentaries, Equator from the Air and Blue Planet Live, and two National Geographic documentaries: Earth Live and One Strange Rock. It has also been presented at the UN headquarters in New York, as well as other ocean conservation and science conferences globally.
- Ocean Alliance becomes one of the first groups in the world to successfully deploy suction-cup data tags on large whales. Data tags are a key tool in whale science, providing fine-scale data on what whales do when they are underwater (an aspect of their lives that prior to the development of tags was difficult for scientists to study). Ocean Alliance's new method is an exciting progression in the field of whale tagging and could lead to advances in our understanding of whale behavior and ecology.

== Headquarters: The Gloucester Paint Factory ==
In 2008, Ocean Alliance purchased the Tarr & Wonson Paint Manufactory in Gloucester, Massachusetts to be its new headquarters.

The Tarr & Wonson Paint Manufactory is significant for being the place where Anti-fouling paint, used to prevent the build-up of marine growth on the bottom of boats, was perfected. Since its building it has been a landmark of Gloucester harbour, and Gloucester fishermen have long counted themselves as being home when they glimpsed the red walls of the structure sitting at the gateway of Gloucester harbour.

As technology developed, the type of paint made at the Gloucester Paint Factory became obsolete, and in the 1980s the Factory was shut down. Over the decades a lack of maintenance, the toxic nature of the chemical compounds used to make the copper-based paint and the elements have all pulled the buildings into disrepair. In 2008 Ocean Alliance purchased the buildings to be their new headquarters with the intention of making the Paint Factory a proud symbol of the city of Gloucester's pioneering spirit and of its intimate connection with the seas.

The Paint Factory Innovation Center houses Ocean Alliance's offices, an innovation lab, a visitor center, the Pamela and Peter Logan Acoustic Library, and 132 linear feet of dockage.

== Major Research Programs ==
=== The Voyage of the Odyssey ===
The Voyage of the Odyssey was a 5-year program which collected the baseline data set on contaminants in the world's oceans. It was launched from San Diego in March 2000, and ended five and a half years later in Boston, August 2005.

In a 1979 National Geographic magazine article Ocean Alliance founder and president Roger Payne predicted that toxic pollution would replace the harpoon as the next greatest threat to whales. Recognizing the stark lack of data on the subject, Payne set his organization Ocean Alliance the task of obtaining a global baseline data set on contaminants.

After years of planning and fund-raising, the program was finally ready to launch in 2000. In the executive summary of the project, Payne stated that, ‘The Voyage of the Odyssey has proven irrefutably that ocean life is becoming polluted to unacceptable levels by metals and human-made contaminants.’

The focus of the program was sperm whales, a cosmopolitan species found in every major ocean. As long-lived apex predators, sperm whales represent a useful bioindicator of health in the marine ecosystem in a toxicological context, owing to the effects of three key processes: bioaccumulation, biomagnification and the generation effect. Sadly, these three processes also make sperm whales, and other apex predators, at great risk from toxic pollution. As mammalian apex predators that nurse their young with milk, they are also relatively similar to us, and thus are seen as the ‘canaries in the golf mine’ regards humanities relationship with the oceans.

The program also had a robust educational and outreach component. In every country they visited, Odyssey crew members met with government leaders, students, teachers and journalists-many of whom kept promoting ocean health after the Odyssey departed for its next research location. The program was also the focus of a major online diary & educational webpage through American broadcaster PBS.

Aside from collecting the first baseline data set on contaminants in the world's oceans, the program was witness to a number of other successes, innovations and firsts. These include:

- uncovering illegal shark finning operations
- documenting the use of massive drift nets in the Mediterranean
- helping to create a 1.2 million square-mile marine mammal sanctuary in Papua New Guinea waters
- made incredibly rare sightings of a live Longman's beaked whale
- recorded sightings of blue whales in equatorial waters where they were thought never to be present
- the first successful satellite tag on a sperm whale (by visiting scientist Bruce Mate)
- the first electrocardiogram of a sperm whale (by visiting scientist Dr. Jorge Reynolds)
- the training of over 100 scientists from Latin America in the benign research techniques developed by the Ocean Alliance;
- the first successful underwater sonar tracking of sperm whales throughout their dives,
- technique for placing remote sensing packages on the backs of whales and for acquiring skin samples more easily.

On the program, Payne commented that, ‘Saving marine animals from the insidious effects of pesticides, fire retardants, plasticizers, and poisonous metals is not a selfless act. By saving the ocean for whales, we may just be able to save countless other oceanic species and leave our children and grandchildren a healthy ocean rather than one contaminated with the by-products of our progress.’ More information on the Voyage of the Odyssey can be found on Ocean Alliance's website.

=== Patagonia Right whale program ===
The Patagonia Right Whale program is one of the longest continually running studies on great whales: as of 2014 the program entered its 44th year. Ocean Alliance founder Roger Payne set up the program in 1970, on realizing that he could identify individual whales based on the patterns of cyamids (whale lice) on their heads. This opened up an enormous opportunity to gain far more information on the life-history of individual whales than had previously been possible. Roger also recognized its significance as it enabled him to learn far more from a live whale than the whaling community was learning from dead whales.

The program is run by Dr. Victoria Rowntree, in conjunction with Dr. Mariano Sironi of the Instituto Conservación de Ballenas. The long-term nature of this program has produced discoveries relating to the ecology, biological life cycle, ethology and conservation of these species. As time has gone on, the program has been expanded to include genetics, feeding ecology and bioacoustics. The techniques that Roger Payne, and later on Victoria Rowntree and Instituto Conservacion de Ballenas, pioneered have since been established among cetacean science programs worldwide.

So called because they were the ‘right’ whale to kill, Southern right whales were brought to the verge of extinction during the early 20th century. Their enormous blubber reserves caused the animals to float after being killed, while their slow-moving nature made them easy targets. Although significant conservation threats still remain (primarily habitat loss), many populations have shown slow signs of recovery. The long-term objective of the Patagonian Right Whale Program is to promote and facilitate this recovery.

=== Gulf of Mexico program ===
In April 2010, approximately 210 million gallons of oil was released into the Gulf of Mexico marine environment following the Deepwater Horizon oil spill. In response, over 2 million gallons of oil dispersant was released, in unprecedented quantities and untested ways, in an effort to break up and sink the oil.

In July 2010, Ocean Alliance, in partnership with the Wise Laboratory of Environmental and Genetic Toxicology, took the RV Odyssey into the area in an effort to determine the, often overlooked, long-term impacts of this environmental catastrophe. After such incidents, people often look no further than the immediate impact: death tolls of particular species are logged, population declines/increases recorded, and these figures are seen as broadly representative of the environmental damage. The toxicological work being conducted by Ocean Alliance and their partners at the Wise Lab was primarily aimed at determining the chronic, long-term impact of the incident-in particular the geno-toxic impacts of oil (and compounds found in oil) and dispersants as they work their way up the trophic food chain.

The long-term effects are believed to be far more significant than the short-term effects, a belief corroborated by on-going research in the Gulf of Mexico and the fact that the impacts of the Exxon Valdez spill (which occurred in 1985 in Prince William Sound, Alaska) are still being studied over 25 years after the initial accident. The total discharge of oil from this spill was approximately one tenth of the Deepwater Horizon spill. Perhaps the most significant economic impact of the Exxon Valdez disaster—the collapse of the Herring fishery, only collapsed four years after the spill, and has not as of 2016 shown signs of recovery. This makes the kind of long-term focused program Ocean Alliance conducted all the more important. Preliminary analysis has shown potentially damaging levels of genotoxic metals including chromium and nickel in Sperm whales living in the area, significantly higher than the global average. Furthermore, it has shown a correlation between proximity to the spill and levels of these genotoxic metals.

To achieve the aim of conducting a long-term analysis, Ocean Alliance monitored the top apex predator of the region, the sperm whales. A resident, non-migratory population of sperm whales resides in the Northern Gulf of Mexico in close proximity to the Deepwater Horizon oil spill. As apex predators, sperm whales act as bio indicators of the health of the marine ecosystem in a toxicological context, demonstrating the effects of three key processes: bioaccumulation, biomagnification and the generation effect. These processes also make sperm whales, and other apex predators, at greater risk from toxic pollution.

Ocean Alliance conducted this study for 5 years, during each summer from 2010 to 2014. For the final two years, they were joined by activist group the Sea Shepherd Conservation Society, as part of a program labelled Operation Toxic Gulf. This afforded the program much more exposure than was previously possible.

=== SnotBot ===
SnotBot is a research program started and run by Ocean Alliance. Within this research program, drones collect respiratory samples (or, in essence, snot) from whales by flying the drone through the blow or spout of a whale. This spout consists of a mixture of biological and non-biological compounds from which various facets of a whale's health and ecology can be inferred.

The SnotBot program was initiated in 2014, as an attempt to explore and harness the potential which drones had in whale science. At first, Ocean Alliance developed their own drones alongside researchers and students at Olin College of Engineering, before moving to consumer drones made by manufacturers such as DJI and Yuneec.

The initial SnotBot expeditions were funded by a successful Kickstarter campaign, which included a campaign video featuring Star Trek and X-Men actor Sir Patrick Stewart. The first three expeditions took place in Patagonia, Argentina; The Sea of Cortez, Mexico; and Alaska, the United States of America.

Since then, over thirty expeditions have taken place with over one thousand samples collected. The team have collected samples from nine species of whale including blue whales, orca, gray whales, southern right whales and humpback whales

The primary SnotBot team has consisted of CEO Iain Kerr, photographer and cameraman Christian Miller, Ocean Alliance Science Manager Andy Rogan, Robotics Manager Chris Zadra, and former Assistant Director Alicia Pensarosa.

The program has also seen considerable attention in the press. It has been featured in two National Geographic documentaries, Earth Live and One Strange Rock; has been presented at the UN, the Singularity Global Summit, various academic conferences, trade shows and academic institutions.

In 2022, Ocean Alliance became the first group in the world to deploy tags on whales using drones successfully. This method makes it easier to deploy more tags on more species of whales. Since its inception, SnotBot has deployed over two hundred tags on whales.

== See also ==
- Marine conservation
