= Songs of the Humpback Whale (album) =

Studio album by Roger Payne
- Released: August 1970
- Recorded: 1970
- Length: 34:26
- Labels: CRM Records (1970); Capitol Records (1970); Windham Hill Records (1992); BGO Records (Compact Disc, remastered, 2001)
- Producers: Roger Payne and Katy Payne

Roger Payne chronology
Songs of the Humpback Whale (1970)	Deep Voices - The Second Whale Record (1977)

Professional ratings
Review scores
Source	Rating
AllMusic	4.5/5 stars

Songs of the Humpback Whale is a 1970 album produced by bio-acoustician Roger Payne. It publicly demonstrated for the first time the elaborate whale vocalizations of humpback whales. Selling over 100,000 copies, it became the bestselling environmental album in history, and its sales benefited the Wildlife Conservation Society's Whale Fund, of which Payne was Scientific Director, and which sought to conserve whales through research and public education. By raising awareness of the intelligence and culture of whales, the album helped spawn a worldwide "Save The Whales" movement, leading to the 1972 United Nations Conference on the Human Environment ten-year global moratorium on commercial whaling (observed by all but a few nations).

== Background ==
"Solo Whale"
The first recording presented on the album

Roger Payne had a background in bat and owl echolocation, but his interest in whale vocalizations came about by chance. In the late 1960s he heard on the radio that a dead whale had washed up on Revere Beach (near Tufts University where he was working) so he drove out to see it. He found that souvenir hunters had already hacked off the flukes from the dead porpoise, someone had carved one's initials in its side, and a cigar butt had been stuffed into its blowhole. He later said "I removed the cigar and stood there for a long time with feelings I cannot describe. Everybody has some such experience that affects him for life, probably several. That night was mine.

In 1966, Payne heard about the whale recordings of Frank Watlington, a Navy engineer who eight years earlier had captured eerie underwater moaning and wailing sounds while manning a top-secret hydrophone station off the coast of Bermuda, listening for Russian submarines. Payne asked for and received copies of the recordings, and soon found that the songs repeated themselves. The shortest songs were about six minutes long, and the longest were over thirty minutes. They could be repeated continuously for up to 24 hours. When the sounds were graphed they displayed a definite structure.

Subsequent research by Payne and his then-wife Katharine Payne discovered that all male whales in a given ocean sing the same song. Further, the whale songs change subtly from year to year, and never went back to previous songs. Katharine Payne further discovered that the longer songs sung by the whales had structures analogous to rhyming, with key structures repeating at intervals. This raises the possibility that the whales use mnemonic devices to help them remember the more complicated songs.

== Reception ==
The album was an unexpected hit, quickly selling over 125,000 copies and eventually going multi-platinum, becoming the most popular nature recording in history. Sales from the album benefited the Whale Fund of the Wildlife Conservation Society, then known as the New York Zoological Society. Payne worked as a research zoologist for the Wildlife Conservation Society and also as Scientific Director of its Whale Fund while producing the album and its follow up, Deep Voices, from 1966 to 1983.

The 1979 Vol. 155, No. 1 issue of National Geographic included a flexi disc with excerpts from the album. The excerpts were accompanied by commentary by Payne. Distributed to 10.5 million subscribers, this constituted the largest single pressing in recording history, and helped to raise public awareness about whales.

The recordings and the tremendous popularity of the album propelled the movement to end commercial whaling, which at the time was pushing many species dangerously close to extinction. In 1970, Payne gave testimony to the United States Department of the Interior for the purpose of getting great whale species listed as endangered species, and he played recordings of humpback whale songs for meeting participants. The following years saw the enactment of various protections for whale species, including the Marine Mammal Protection Act of 1972, and the Endangered Species Act of 1973. Commercial whaling was finally banned by the International Whaling Commission in 1986.

Excerpts from the record have been used in songs by Judy Collins, Léo Ferré, Kate Bush, in the symphonic suite And God Created Great Whales by Alan Hovhaness, and in the movie Star Trek IV: The Voyage Home. An excerpt was also included on the Voyager Gold Record which was carried aboard the Voyager program spacecraft. Excerpts from "Solo Whale" were used to create the sound effects for the monster Biollante in the 1989 Toho film Godzilla vs. Biollante.

Numerous other recordings of humpback and other whales have attempted to capitalize on its popularity. In 2010 the album was inducted into the National Recording Registry as one of the significant recordings that "are culturally, historically, or aesthetically important, and/or inform or reflect life in the United States."

In 1977, Payne released a follow-up album, Deep Voices - The Second Whale Record (Capitol ST 11598), which included sounds of blue whales and right whales.

== Track listing ==
1. "Solo Whale" – 9:32 (recording: Frank Watlington)
2. "Slowed-Down Solo Whale" – 1:05 (recording: Frank Watlington)
3. "Tower Whales" – 3:23 (recording: Roger & Katharine Payne)
4. "Distant Whale" – 3:55 (recording: Frank Watlington)
5. "Three Whale Trip" – 16:31 (recording: Roger & Katharine Payne)

== Production notes ==
- Produced by Roger Payne
- Recorded by Frank Watlington and Roger Payne
