= Neotonality =

Type of musical composition

Neotonality (or neocentricity) is an inclusive term referring to musical compositions of the twentieth century in which the tonality of the common-practice period (i.e. functional harmony and tonic-dominant relationships) is replaced by one or several nontraditional tonal conceptions, such as tonal assertion or contrapuntal motion around a central chord.

Although associated with the neoclassicism of Stravinsky and Les Six in France and Hindemith in Germany, neotonality is a broader concept, encompassing such nationalist composers as Bartók and Kodály in Hungary, Janáček and Martinů in Czechoslovakia, Vaughan Williams in England, Chávez and Revueltas in Mexico, Villa-Lobos in Brazil, and Ginastera in Argentina. Figures with less nationalistic ties such as Prokofiev, Shostakovich, William Walton, Britten, and Samuel Barber also are counted amongst neotonal composers. Without establishing any one style or school, neotonality became the dominant international idea in the 1930s and 1940s ("new tonalities"). Many of these composers (e.g., Bartók, Hindemith, Prokofiev, and Stravinsky) combine features characteristic of common-practice tonality with features of atonality.

The most common means of establishing a tonal centre in neotonality is by "assertion". This may involve repeating a central pitch or emphasizing it in some other way, for example through instrumentation, register, rhythmic elongation, or metric accent. No single method of tonal assertion ever became dominant in the 20th century. Another possibility is to retain some element of common-practice tonality, such as beginning and ending on the same triad, using tonic or dominant pedal points, or through the use of contrapuntal motion around some central chord.
