= Roger Payne =

American biologist (1935–2023)

- Born: Roger Searle Payne; January 29, 1935; New York City, U.S.
- Died: June 10, 2023 (aged 88); South Woodstock, Vermont, U.S.
- Education: Horace Mann School
- Alma mater: Harvard University (BA, 1957); Cornell University (PhD, 1961)
- Occupations: Zoologist; researcher; science administrator; conservationist
- Employers: Ocean Alliance, President; Project CETI, Principal Advisor
- Known for: Discovery of whale song amongst humpback whales
- Spouses: Katharine Boynton (m. 1960; div. 1985) Lisa Harrow (m. 1991)
- Children: 4

Roger Searle Payne (January 29, 1935 – June 10, 2023) was an American biologist and environmentalist famous for his 1967 discovery (with Scott McVay) of whale song among humpback whales. Payne later became an important figure in the worldwide campaign to end commercial whaling.

== Early life ==
Payne was born on January 29, 1935, in Manhattan, New York City, to Elizabeth (née Searle) and Edward Benedict Payne. His mother was a music teacher and his father an electrical engineer. Payne graduated from Horace Mann School in 1952. He later received his BA degree at Harvard University and his Ph.D. at Cornell University.

== Career ==
Payne spent the early years of his career studying echolocation in bats (and how their food, moths, avoid them) and auditory localization in owls. Desiring to work with something more directly linked to conservation, he later focused his research on whales. He and fellow researcher Scott McVay in 1967 discovered the complex sonic arrangements performed by male humpback whales during the breeding season. The specific discovery was made during a research trip to Bermuda with a naval engineer who was documenting underwater sounds while listening for the sounds of Russian submarines.

Payne described the whale songs as "exuberant, uninterrupted rivers of sound" with long, repeated "themes", each song lasting up to 30 minutes and sung by an entire group of male humpbacks at once. The songs would be varied slightly between each breeding season, with a few new phrases added on and a few others dropped. He identified these sounds as whales singing to one another.

Payne's recordings were released in 1970 as an LP called Songs of the Humpback Whale (still the best-selling nature sound record of all time) which helped to gain momentum for the Save the Whales movement seeking to end commercial whaling, which at the time was pushing many species dangerously close to extinction. Commercial whaling was finally banned by the International Whaling Commission in 1986.

Payne subsequently led many expeditions on the world's oceans studying whales, their migrations, cultures and vocalizations. Payne was also the first to suggest fin whales and blue whales can communicate with sound across whole oceans, a theory since confirmed. In 1975 a second LP was released, and in 1987 Payne collaborated with musician Paul Winter in combining whalesong with human music.

Whale recordings by Frank Watlington (with commentary by Payne) were released on a flexi disc soundsheet inside the January 1979 National Geographic magazine. This issue, at 10.5 million copies, became the largest single press run of any record at the time. In addition to whale recordings Payne also published books and worked with film crews on many television documentary productions and on the IMAX movie Whales: An Unforgettable Journey.

In 1971, Payne founded Ocean Alliance, a 501(c)(3) organization working for whale and ocean conservation, based in Gloucester, Massachusetts. He was also an assistant professor of biology at Rockefeller University and, concurrently, a research zoologist at the Institute for Research in Animal Behavior (IRAB), run by Rockefeller University and the Wildlife Conservation Society, then known as the New York Zoological Society. IRAB was succeeded by the Wildlife Conservation Society's Center for Field Biology and Conservation (CFBC) in 1972, and Payne continued as a Wildlife Conservation Society research zoologist and scientific director of the society's Whale Fund until 1983. From 2020, Payne served as principal advisor to Project CETI (Cetacean Translation Initiative), a TED Audacious Project and nonprofit, interdisciplinary scientific and conservation initiative. As a member of Friends of Lolita, Inc. (aka Friends of Toki), a non–profit corporation, one of Payne's last involvements was in supporting the planned move of the captive orca Lolita from the Miami Seaquarium to a sanctuary in the Salish Sea.

== Personal life ==
From 1960 to 1985 Payne was married to whale and elephant researcher Katharine Payne, who performed similar research on the vocalizations of elephants and humpbacks. The couple had four children. Payne married actress and environmentalist Lisa Harrow in 1991.

Payne died at his home in South Woodstock, Vermont from squamous-cell carcinoma on June 10, 2023, at the age of 88.

Five days before his death, Payne published an essay in Time calling for a new conservation movement. He wrote, "As my time runs out, I am possessed with the hope that humans worldwide are smart enough and adaptable enough to put the saving of other species where it belongs: at the top of the list of our most important jobs. I believe that science can help us survive our folly."

== Cultural influence ==
- Singer Judy Collins released her best-selling album Whales & Nightingales in 1970, which featured some of Payne's whale recordings on the track "Farewell to Tarwathie".
- Also in 1970 composer Alan Hovhaness composed And God Created Great Whales, the score for which contains excerpts from Payne's recordings
- In 1977 Roger Payne's recordings of humpback whales were included in the Voyager Golden Record carried aboard the Voyager program spacecraft, the first human artifacts to leave the Solar System.
- Singer Kate Bush's debut album The Kick Inside in 1978 features a portion of 'slowed-down solo whale' (from Songs of the Humpback Whale) as an intro to the opening track "Moving".
- Star Trek IV: The Voyage Home (1986) features Payne's recordings, in a plot about rescuing humpback whales from extinction by moving a breeding pair from 1986 to 300 years in the future.
- In 2010, the band Glass Wave included Payne's whale recordings in the first track ("Balena") and last track ("Moby Dick") of their album.

== Works ==
- Producer, Songs of the Humpback Whale, a 1970 LP (and later CD)
- Producer, Deep Voices, a 1977 LP of more humpback songs as well as blue and fin whales
- Co-producer, Whales Alive, a 1987 LP collaboration with musicians Paul Winter and Paul Halley
- Host, In the Company of Whales, a 1991 television documentary for The Discovery Channel
- Author, Among Whales, a 1995 book
- Host, Finite Oceans, a 1995 television documentary
- Co-writer/co-director, Whales: An Unforgettable Journey, a 1997 IMAX film

== Discography ==
=== Albums ===
Title	Details	US	Certification(s)
Songs of the Humpback Whale	Released in August 1970 by CRM Records, Capitol Records, Windham Hill Records, & BGO Records	176	US: 2x Platinum
Deep Voices - The Second Whale Record	Released in 1977 by Capitol Records	—	
