= Stephen Portman =

American conductor (born 1935)

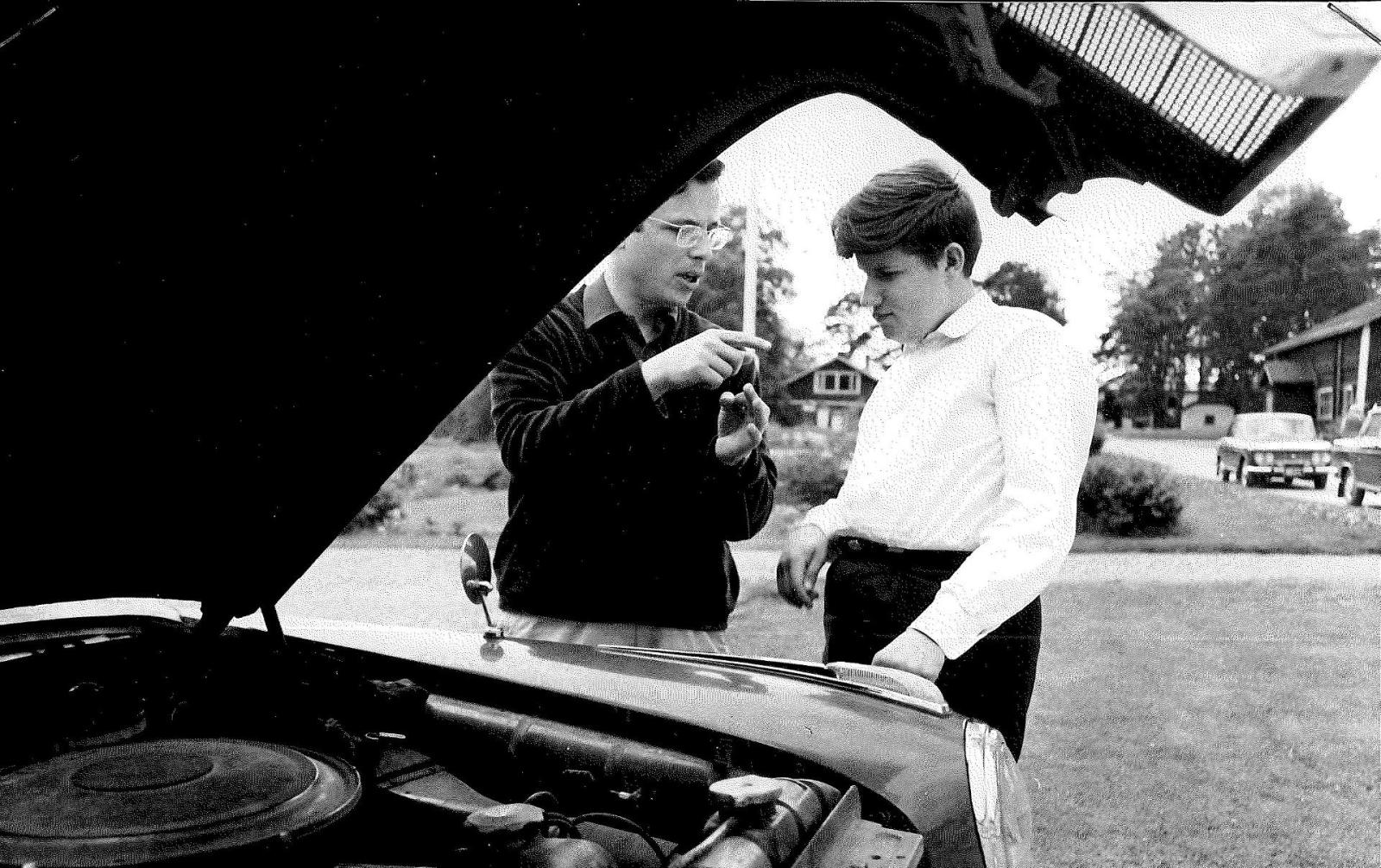
Stephen Portman and the Russian pianist Grigory Sokolov examining a car engine in Finland, 1967.

Stephen Ivan Portman (1 January 1935 - 25 August 2026) was an American conductor and pianist, educated in USA, Italy and Finland.

Portman was born in Mount Vernon, New York, studied the piano with Paul Wittgenstein and Paul Nordoff in New York, in Rome at the Academy of St. Cecilia with Carlo Zecchi and then at Juilliard School with Sascha Gorodnitzki in the 1950s, and conducting at Mannes School of Music with Carl Bamberger. He studied with Pierre Monteux and subsequently on a fellowship with George Szell and the Cleveland Orchestra. He moved to Finland and continued his studies at the Sibelius Academy with conductor Jussi Jalas in 1962–1964.

He held the post of musical director of the Opera Studio at the Sibelius Academy between 1965 and 1970 and then conductor at the Finnish National Opera in 1969–1970, and at Oulu Symphony Orchestra 1970–1975. While Music Director of Oulu Symphony Orchestra, he conducted the premiere of Cantus Arcticus by Einojuhani Rautavaara. After which, he conducted opera in Gothenburg and Malmö among others. He's also conducted in Italy, Denmark, USSR, Czechoslovakia, South Africa and the US.

In 1977, he moved to England and has conducted the BBC Singers and the Royal Philharmonic Orchestra with Birgit Nilsson at The Proms. Portman was honorary patron of the Kent-based Caritas Chamber Choir from 2015 until 2026.

He retired from active conducting in 1985.

== Sources ==
- Otavan Iso Musiikkitietosanakirja 4, pp. 624–625. Helsinki 1978. ISBN 951-1-04763-9 (in Finnish)
