= Julie Freeman (artist) =

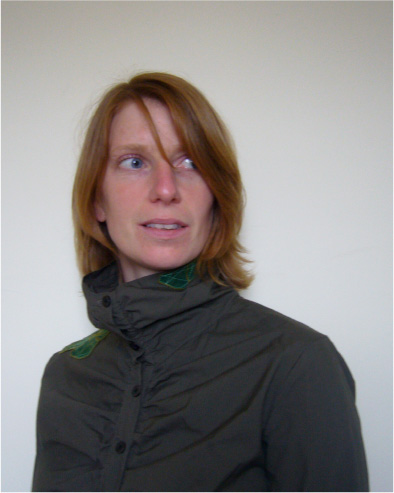
- Born: 1972 (age 53–54); Halton, Buckinghamshire, England
- Education: Lansdown Centre for Electronic Arts, Middlesex University
- Known for: Digital art, installation art, Sound art
- Awards: NESTA fellowship, Wellcome Trust Arts Award (2007-8) TED fellowship (2011-)

Julie Freeman (born 1972 in Halton, UK) is an artist whose work spans visual, audio and digital art forms and explores the relationship between science, nature and how humans interact with it.

== Biography ==
Freeman's work has focused on using electronic technologies to ‘translate nature’ – whether it is through the sound of torrential rain dripping on a giant rhubarb leaf, a pair of mobile concrete speakers who lurk in galleries haranguing passersby with fractured sonic samples, or by providing an interactive platform from which to view the flap, twitch and prick of dogs' ears.

In 2005 she launched her most known digital artwork, 'The Lake', which used hydrophones, custom software and advanced technology to track electronically tagged fish and translate their movement into an audio-visual experience. The work was developed over eighteen months, was exhibited at Tingrith Coarse Fishery and supported by a two-year arts fellowship from the National Endowment for Science, Technology and the Arts (NESTA). It was exhibited at the Tingrith Fishery in Bedfordshire.

She was artist-in-residence at the Microsystems and Nanotechnology Centre at Cranfield University (2007-9) where, with Professor Jeremy J. Ramsden, she created works that aimed to increase public understanding of self-assembly and organising processes at the nanoscale, and their potential social impacts and consequences.

In 2009, Freeman's Dogs' Ears artwork gave rise to 'twoofing' (dogs tweeting) in the early days of Twitter art.

External videos
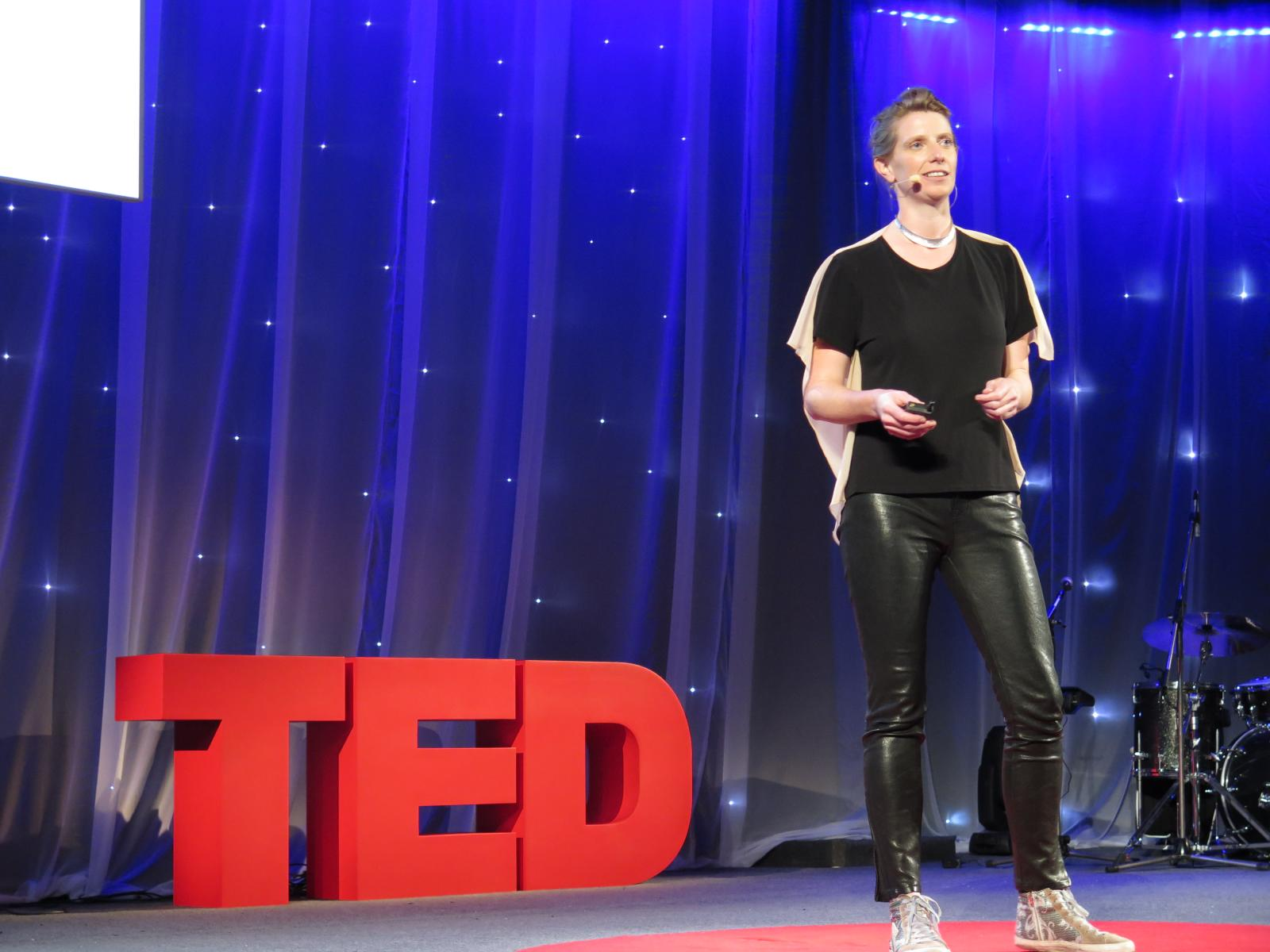
- Julie Freeman's Data as Culture, 3:33, TED talks
- Data becomes art in Julie Freeman’s “We Need Us”, 1:39, TEDBlog

Freeman is a graduate of the MA in Digital Arts at the Centre for Electronic Arts, Middlesex University, London and board member of nonprofit collective MzTEK (which encourages women artists to pick up technical skills). She earned a PhD from Queen Mary University of London for her thesis 'Defining Data as an Art Material', which was one of Leonardo's highest-ranking abstracts of 2021. She was a Nesta Arts Fellow and is the recipient of a Wellcome Trust, Arts Council award. Additionally, she is a TED senior fellow.

She has been featured on the BBC World Service programme The Science Hour and The Guardian's online Tech Weekly podcast.

Freeman co-founded the Data as Culture art programme at the Open Data Institute.
