= Katy Payne =

Expert on animals' communication

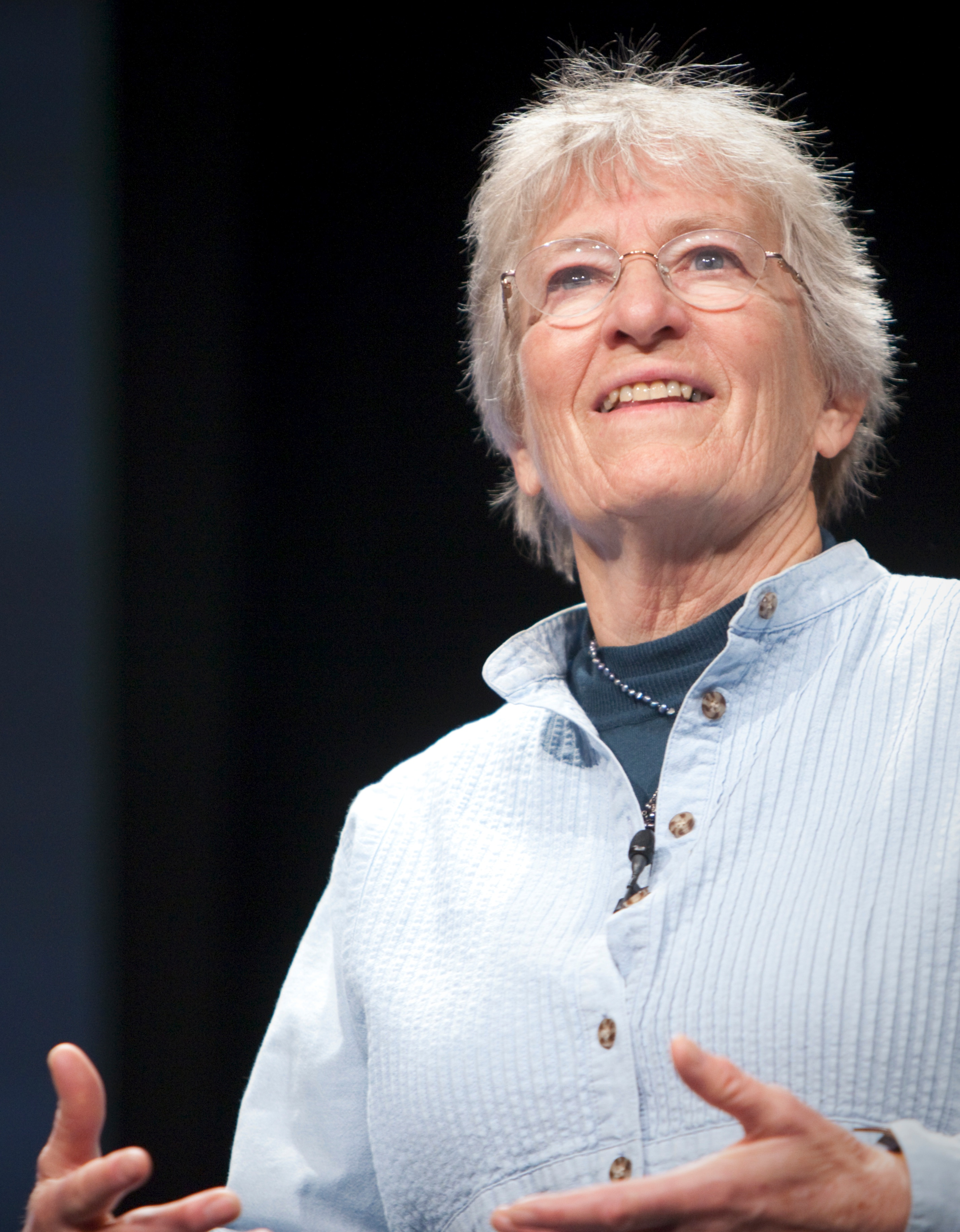
- Payne in 2009
- Born: Katharine Boynton; 1937 (age 88–89); Ithaca, New York
- Education: Cornell University
- Spouse: Roger Payne (m. 1960; div. 1985)

Katharine Boynton Payne (born 1937) is an American zoologist and researcher in the Bioacoustics Research Program at the Laboratory of Ornithology at Cornell University. Payne studied music and biology in college and after a decade doing research in the savanna elephant country in Kenya, Zimbabwe, and Namibia, she founded Cornell's Elephant Listening Project in 1999.

== Early life and education ==
Payne was born Katharine Boynton in Ithaca, New York, in 1937. Her father was a Cornell University professor and her grandfather was the wildlife illustrator Louis Agassiz Fuertes. Payne attended Cornell, where she met Roger Payne, then a graduate student. They married in 1960.

== Career ==
Initially a researcher of whales with her then husband, Payne turned to investigating elephants after observing them at the Oregon Zoo in Portland. In 1984, she and other researchers such as Joyce Poole discovered that elephants make infrasonic calls to one another that might be detectable at distances as far as ten kilometers. The calls aided in travel and mating. Payne founded the Elephant Listening Project (ELP) to use these calls as a means of measuring the behavior of elephants and the size of the elephant population. Payne was featured in the 1984 PBS series The Voyage of the Mimi.

In 2004, Payne's initial recordings of elephants were selected as one of 50 recordings chosen that year by the Library of Congress to be added to the National Recording Registry.

== Whale song research ==
Payne and her husband worked at sea to Bermuda in 1968. With the help of a Navy engineer, Frank Watlington monitored hydrophones many miles into the sea to capture the sounds of the humpback whales. After 31 years of analyzing the recordings. Payne discovered the predictable ways in which the whales change their songs each season and, with her colleague Linda Guinee, also discovered that whales use rhymes in their songs. The spectrograms of the whale voices showed peaks, valleys, and gaps. The visual representation of the whales vocalization looked like melodies and rhythms according to Payne.

== The Elephant Listening Project ==
The concept behind the Elephant Listening Project began to form in 1984 when Katy Payne, observing elephants in the Portland Zoo, discovered that elephants communicate in low frequencies. After four months in Portland, Cornell University's acoustic biologists Carl Hopkins and Bob Capranica partnered with Payne to record and measure the infrasonic communication and behavior of elephants. By 1999 Payne published her elephant discoveries in her book Silent Thunder, and the Elephant Listening Project was officially founded in the Laboratory of Ornithology to focus on long-term research on forest elephants.

In 2005 Katy Payne retired and Peter Wrege took over the project. Since then the ELP has been listening to and studying elephant communication in the forests of Central Africa, applying Payne's insights to further her findings and to support the conservation of elephants. Co-founder of the ELP, Andrea Turkalo, conducts the longest-running study of forest elephants, at the Dzanga forest clearing in the Central African Republic. Turkalo has identified more than 4,000 individual elephants and has tracked their family relationships, social behavior, history of visits to the clearing, and reproduction. These data provide the most complete source of material available for understanding forest elephant demography and behavior.

The ELP has ongoing monitoring studies in Gabon, Republic of Congo, and Cameroon. Through the use of autonomous sound recorders, the ELP can monitor changes in elephant activity in response to environmental conditions and changing human commercial activity in the forests, and is using the detection of poaching activity to inform and improve anti-poaching patrol strategies.
