= Whale vocalization =

Sounds produced by whales

Humpback whales are well known for their songs. Click the arrow to play the video, which includes audio.

Whales use a variety of sounds for communication and sensation. The mechanisms used to produce sound vary from one family of cetaceans to another. Marine mammals, including whales, dolphins, and porpoises, are much more dependent on sound than land mammals due to the limited effectiveness of other senses in water. Sight is less effective for marine mammals because of the way particulates in the ocean scatter light. Smell is also limited, as molecules diffuse more slowly in water than in air, which makes smelling less effective. However, the speed of sound is roughly three times greater in water than in the atmosphere at sea level. As sea mammals are so dependent on hearing to communicate and feed, environmentalists and cetologists are concerned that they are being harmed by the increased ambient noise in the world's oceans caused by ships, sonar, marine seismic surveys and offshore wind farms.

The word "song" is used to describe the pattern of regular and predictable sounds made by some species of whales, especially the humpback whale. This is included with or in comparison with music, and male humpback whales have been described as "inveterate composers" of songs that are "'strikingly similar' to human musical traditions". This position has been complicated by more recent research, however. It has been suggested that humpback songs communicate male fitness to female whales, although this explanation has been challenged on various grounds.

== Types and purpose of vocalization ==
While the complex sounds of the humpback whale (and some blue whales) are believed to be primarily used in sexual selection, there are simpler sounds that are created by other species of whales that have an alternative use and are used all year round. Whale watchers have watched mother whales lift their young towards the surface in a playful motion, while making a noise that resembles cooing in humans. This cooing-like noise made by whales seems designed to relax their young and is one of several distinct everyday noises whales are known to make. Unlike some fish such as sharks, a toothed whale's sense of smell is absent, causing them to rely heavily on echolocation, both for hunting prey and for navigating the ocean under darkness. This requires the whales to produce noise year round to ensure they are able to navigate around any obstacles they may face such as sunken ships or other animals.

It has also been proven that whales are extremely social creatures. The noises that are made throughout the entire year (the main sounds being whistles, clicks, and pulsed calls) are used to communicate with other members of their pod. Each sound a whale makes could mean something different. The clicking noises whales make are used for navigation.

The question of whether whales sometimes sing purely for aesthetic enjoyment, personal satisfaction, or 'for art's sake', is considered by some to be "an untestable question".

=== Song of the humpback whale ===
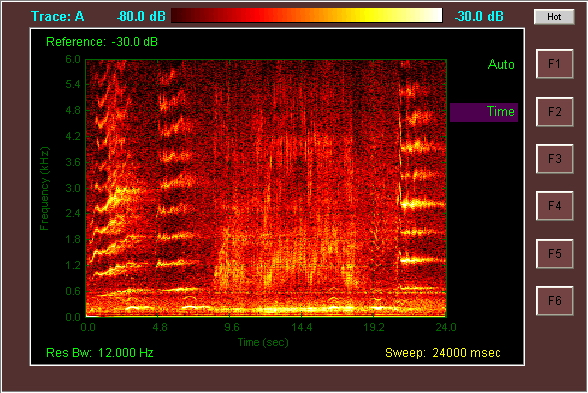
Spectrogram of humpback whale vocalizations. Detail is shown for the first 24 seconds of the 37-second recording below.

Interest in whale song was aroused by researchers Katy and Roger Payne as well as Scott McVay after the songs were brought to their attention by a Bermudian named Frank Watlington who was working for the US government at the SOFAR station listening for Russian submarines with underwater hydrophones off the coast of the island. The Paynes released the best-selling Songs of the Humpback Whale in 1970, and the whale songs were quickly incorporated into human music by, among others, singer Judy Collins, as well as George Crumb, Paul Winter, and David Rothenberg.

The humpback whale produces a series of repetitious sounds at varying frequencies known as whale song. Marine biologist Philip Clapham describes the song as "probably the most complex in the animal kingdom."

Male humpback whales perform these vocalizations often during the mating season, and so it was initially believed the purpose of songs is to aid mate selection. However, no evidence was found that links these songs to reprosexuality.

The songs follow a distinct hierarchical structure. The base units of the song (sometimes loosely called the "notes") are single uninterrupted emissions of sound that last up to a few seconds. These sounds vary in frequency from 20 Hz to upward of 24 kHz (the typical human range of hearing is 20 Hz to 20 kHz). The units may be frequency-modulated (i.e., the pitch of the sound may go up or down or stay the same during the note) or amplitude-modulated (get louder or softer). However, the adjustment of bandwidth on a spectrogram representation of the song reveals the essentially pulsed nature of the FM sounds.

A collection of four or six units is known as a sub-phrase, lasting perhaps ten seconds (see also phrase (music)). A collection of two sub-phrases is a phrase. A whale will typically repeat the same phrase over and over for two to four minutes. This is known as a theme. A collection of themes is known as a song. The whale song will last up to 30 or so minutes, and will be repeated over and over again over the course of hours or even days. This "Russian doll" hierarchy of sounds suggests a syntactic structure that is more human-like in its complexity than other forms of animal communication like bird songs, which have only linear structure.

All the whales in an area sing virtually the same song at any point in time and the song is constantly and slowly evolving over time. For example, over the course of a month a particular unit that started as an upsweep (increasing in frequency) might slowly flatten to become a constant note. Another unit may get steadily louder. The pace of evolution of a whale's song also changes—some years the song may change quite rapidly, whereas in other years little variation may be recorded.

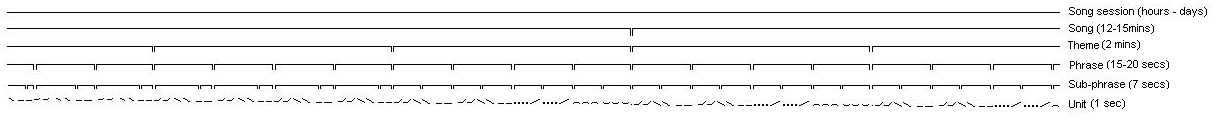
Idealized schematic of the song of a humpback whale.
Redrawn from Payne, et al. (1983)

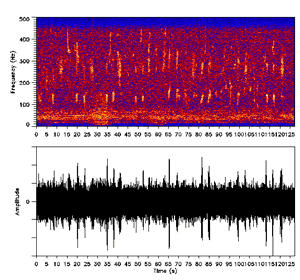
Humpback whale, sound spectrum and time plots

Whales occupying the same geographical areas (which can be as large as entire ocean basins) tend to sing similar songs, with only slight variations. Whales from non-overlapping regions sing entirely different songs.

As the song evolves, it appears that old patterns are not revisited. An analysis of 19 years of whale songs found that while general patterns in song could be spotted, the same combination never recurred.

Humpback whales may also make stand-alone sounds that do not form part of a song, particularly during courtship rituals. Finally, humpbacks make a third class of sound called the feeding call. This is a long sound (5 to 10 s duration) of near constant frequency. Humpbacks generally feed cooperatively by gathering in groups, swimming underneath shoals of fish and all lunging up vertically through the fish and out of the water together. Prior to these lunges, whales make their feeding call. The exact purpose of the call is not known.

Some scientists have proposed that humpback whale songs may serve an echolocative purpose, but this has been subject to disagreement.

=== Other whale sounds ===
Humpback whales have also been found to make a range of other social sounds to communicate such as "grunts", "groans", "thwops", "snorts" and "barks".

In 2009, researchers found that blue whale song has been deepening in its tonal frequency since the 1960s. While noise pollution has increased ambient ocean noise by over 12 decibels since the mid-20th century, researcher Mark McDonald indicated that higher pitches would be expected if the whales were straining to be heard.

Killer whales have been observed to produce long range calls that are stereotyped and high frequency travelling distances from 10–16 km (6.2–9.9 mi) as well as short range calls that can travel distances from 5–9 km (3.1–5.6 mi). Short range calls are reported during social and resting periods while long range are more commonly reported during foraging and feeding.

Most other whales and dolphins produce sounds of varying degrees of complexity. Of particular interest are beluga whales, commonly called "sea canaries", which produce an immense variety of whistles, clicks and pulses. One captive male beluga named NOC (pronounced "no-see") was documented spontaneously imitating the vocal patterns of adult male human speech, which are far lower pitched than normal belugas vocalizations; to achieve these frequencies he deliberately overinflated his vestibular sac, which belugas typically use to keep water out of the blowhole, to control the pressure in his nasal tract.

It was previously thought that most baleen whales make sounds at about 15–20 hertz. However, a team of marine biologists, led by Mary Ann Daher of the Woods Hole Oceanographic Institution, reported in New Scientist in December 2004 that they had been tracking a whale in the North Pacific for 12 years that was "singing" at 52 Hz. Scientists have been unable to explain this phenomenon. For humans 52 Hz is a very low sound; it is audible through human ears as a low moaning sound, while normal whales are inaudibly low. It was not expected that this whale was a new species, more so this whale indicated that a currently known species potentially has a much wider vocal range than previously thought. There is disagreement in the scientific community regarding the uniqueness of the whale's vocalization and whether it is a member of a hybrid whale such as the well documented blue and fin whale hybrids.

== Mechanisms of sound production ==
Humans produce voiced sounds by passing air through the larynx. Within the larynx, when the vocal cords are brought close together, the passing air will force them to alternately close and open, separating the continuous airstream into discrete pulses of air that are heard as a vibration. This vibration is further modified by speech organs in the oral and nasal cavities, creating sounds which are used in human speech.

Cetacean sound production differs markedly from this mechanism. The precise mechanism differs in the two suborders of cetaceans: the Odontoceti (toothed whales, including dolphins) and the Mysticeti (baleen whales, including the largest whales such as the blue whale).

=== Odontocete whales ===
Process in a dolphin echolocation: in green the sounds generated by the dolphin, in red from the fish.

Idealized dolphin head showing the regions involved in sound production. This image was redrawn from Cranford (2000).

Odontocetes produce rapid bursts of high-frequency clicks that are thought to be primarily for echolocation. Specialized organs in an odontocete produce collections of clicks and buzzes at frequencies from 0.2 to 150 kHz to obtain sonic information about its environment. Lower frequencies are used for distance echolocation, due to the fact that shorter wavelengths do not travel as far as longer wavelengths underwater. Higher frequencies are more effective at shorter distances, and can reveal more detailed information about a target. Echoes from clicks convey not only the distance to the target, but also the size, shape, speed, and vector of its movement. Additionally, echolocation allows the odontocete to easily discern the difference between objects that are different in material composition, even if visually identical, by their different densities. Individuals also appear to be able to isolate their own echoes during pod feeding activity without interference from other pod members' echolocations.

Whistles are used for communication. Four- to six-month-old calves develop unique sounds that they use most frequently throughout their lives. Such "signature whistles" are distinctive to the individual and may serve as a form of identification among other odontocetes. Though a large pod of dolphins will produce a wide range of different noises, very little is known about the meaning of the sound. Frankel quotes one researcher who says listening to a school of odontocetes is like listening to a group of children at a school playground.

The multiple sounds odontocetes make are produced by passing air through a structure in the head called the phonic lips. Biologically the structure is homologous to an upper lip located in the nasal cavity, but mechanistically the phonic lips act similarly to human vocal "cords" (vocal folds), which in humans are located in the larynx. As the air passes through this narrow passage, the phonic lip membranes are sucked together, causing the surrounding tissue to vibrate. These vibrations can, as with the vibrations in the human larynx, be consciously controlled with great sensitivity. The vibrations pass through the tissue of the head to the melon, which shapes and directs the sound into a beam of sound useful in echolocation. Every toothed whale except the sperm whale has two sets of phonic lips and is thus capable of making two sounds independently. Once the air has passed the phonic lips it enters the vestibular sac. From there, the air may be recycled back into the lower part of the nasal complex, ready to be used for sound creation again, or passed out through the blowhole.

The French name for phonic lips, museau de singe, translates literally as "monkey's muzzle", which the phonic lip structure is supposed to resemble in sperm whales. New cranial analysis using computed axial and single photon emission computed tomography scans in 2004 showed, at least in the case of bottlenose dolphins, that air might be supplied to the nasal complex from the lungs, enabling the sound creation process to continue for as long as the dolphin can add air from the lungs.

==== Sperm whale ====
The sperm whale's vocalizations are all based on clicking, described in four types: the usual echolocation, creaks, codas, and slow clicks. The most distinctive vocalizations are codas, which are short rhythmic sequences of clicks, mostly numbering 3–12 clicks, in stereotyped patterns. They are the result of vocal learning within a stable social group. Some codas express clan identity, and denote different patterns of travel, foraging, and socializing or avoidance among clans. As "arbitrary traits that function as reliable indicators of cultural group membership," clan identity codas act as symbolic markers that modulate interactions between individuals.

Individual identity in sperm whale vocalizations is an ongoing scientific issue, however. A distinction needs to be made between cues and signals. Human acoustic tools can distinguish individual whales by analyzing micro-characteristics of their vocalizations, and the whales can probably do the same. This does not prove that the whales deliberately use some vocalizations to signal individual identity in the manner of the signature whistles that bottlenose dolphins use as individual labels.

=== Mysticete whales ===
Mysticetes do not have phonic lip structure. Instead, they have a larynx that appears to play a role in sound production, as it has vocal folds (vocal "cord") homologs in the U-shaped fold supported by arytenoid cartilages. Whales do not have to exhale in order to produce sound, as they capture the air in a laryngeal sac. It is likely that they recycle air from this sac back to the lungs for the next vocalization. They do not have bony cranial sinuses, but there is a pterygoid air sac. Its role in sound production is unclear (perhaps resonance?), but most likely it is for hearing, as it appears to preserve an airspace at depth around the ear ossicles.

==== Vocal plasticity and acoustic behavior ====
There are at least nine separate blue whale acoustic populations worldwide. Over the last 50 years blue whales have changed the way they are singing. Calls are progressively getting lower in frequency. For example, the Australian pygmy blue whales are decreasing their mean call frequency rate at approximately 0.35 Hz/year.

The migration patterns of blue whales remain unclear. Some populations appear to be resident in habitats of year-round high productivity in some years, while others undertake long migrations to high-latitude feeding grounds, but the extent of migrations and the components of the populations that undertake them are poorly known.

==== Sound levels ====
The frequency of baleen whale sounds ranges from 10 Hz to 31 kHz. A list of typical levels is shown in the table below.

Source	Broadband source level (dB re 1 $\mu$Pa at 1m)
Fin whale moans	155–186
Blue whale moans	155–188
Gray whale moans	142–185
Bowhead whale tonals, moans and song	128–189

== Human interaction ==
Researchers use hydrophones (often adapted from their original military use in tracking submarines) to ascertain the exact location of the origin of whale noises. Their methods also allow them to detect how far through an ocean a sound travels. Research by Dr. Christopher Clark of Cornell University conducted using military data showed that whale noises travel for thousands of kilometres. As well as providing information about song production, the data allows researchers to follow the migratory path of whales throughout the "singing" (mating) season. An important finding is that whales, in a process called the Lombard effect, adjust their song to compensate for background noise pollution.

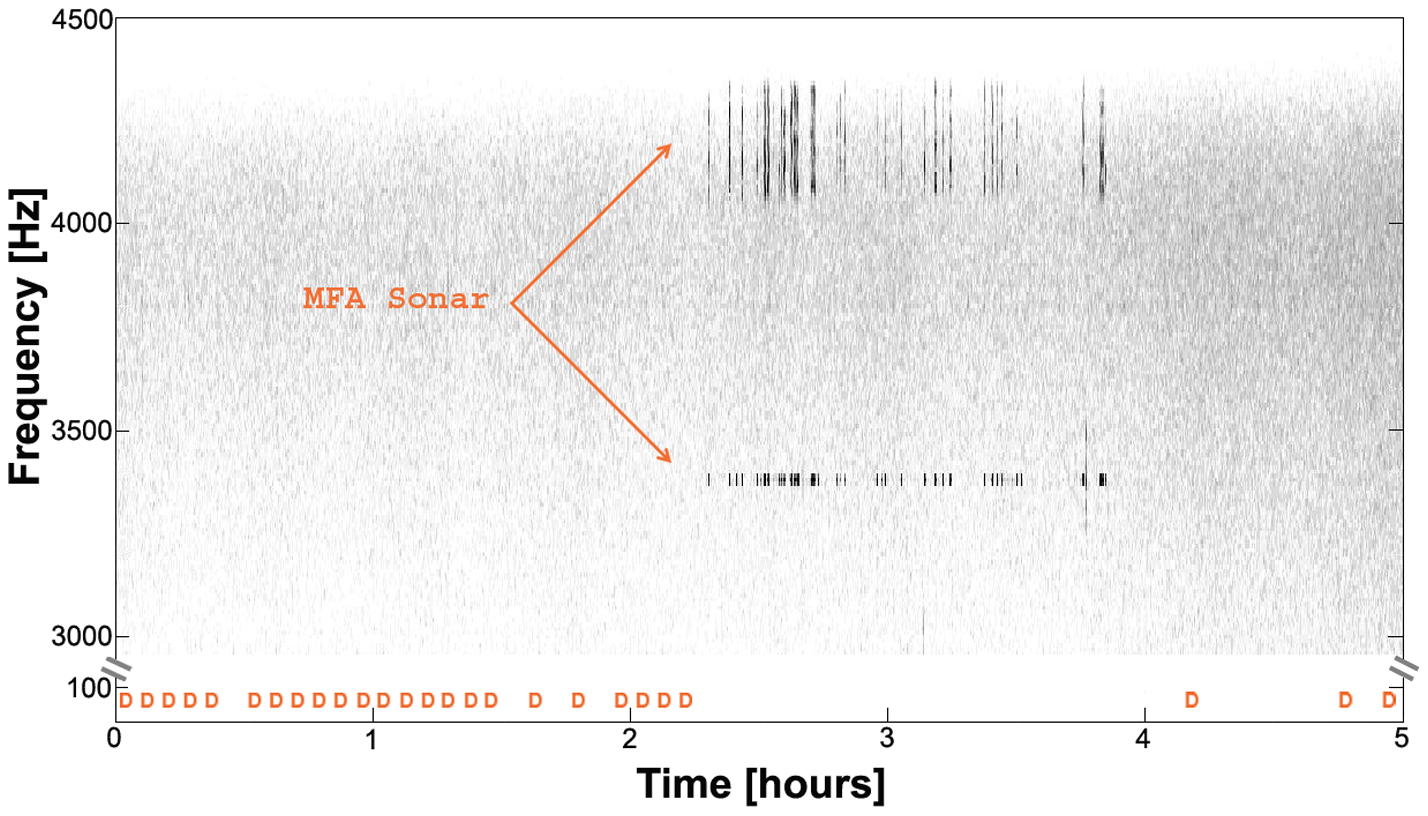
Blue whales stop producing foraging D calls once a mid-frequency sonar is activated, even though the sonar frequency range (1–8 kHz) far exceeds their sound production range (25–100 Hz).

Moreover, there is evidence that blue whales stop producing foraging D calls once a mid-frequency sonar is activated, even though the sonar frequency range (1–8 kHz) far exceeds their sound production range (25–100 Hz).

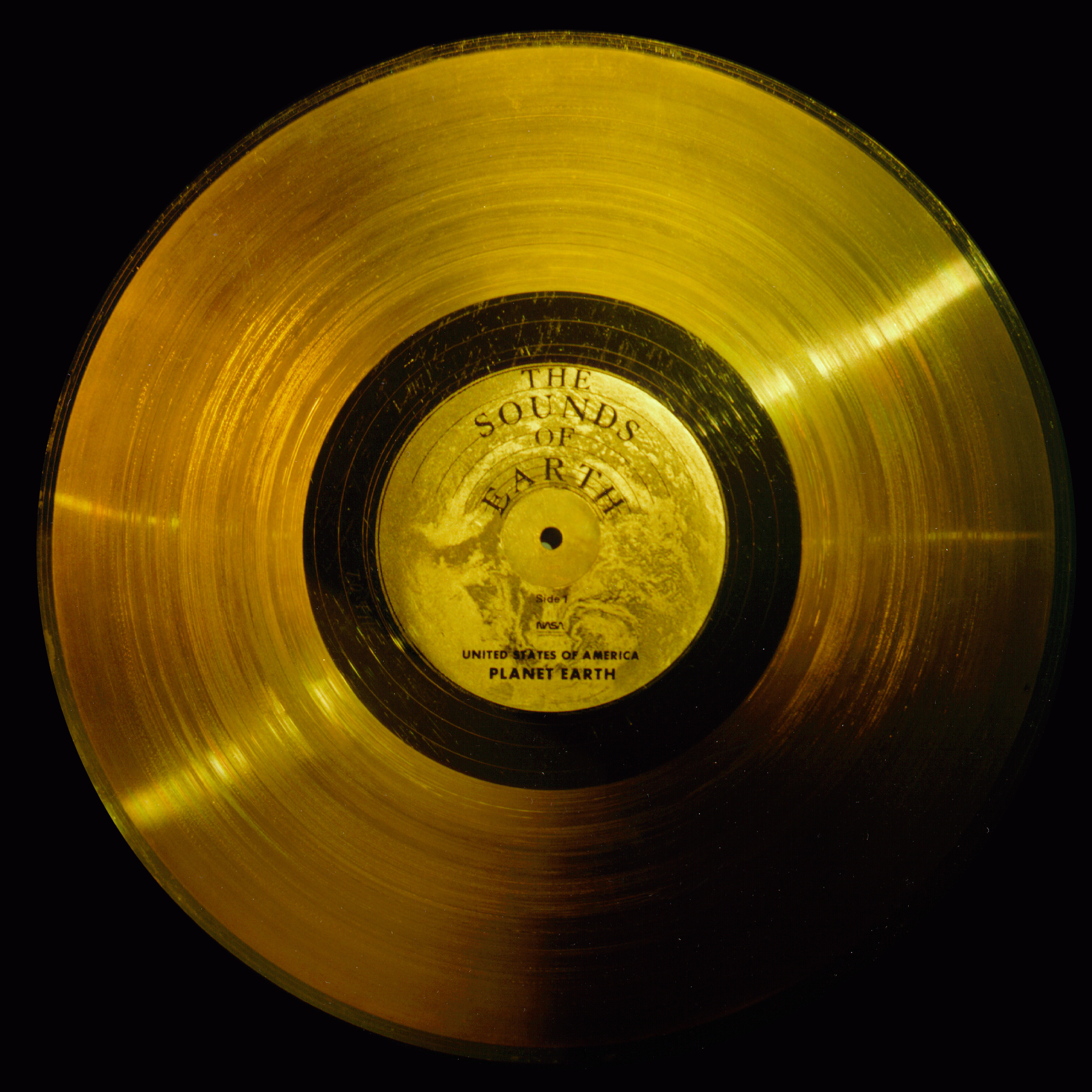
Voyager Golden Records carried whale songs into outer space with other sounds representing planet Earth.

Research indicates that ambient noise from boats is doubling with each decade, reducing the range at which whale sounds can be heard. Prior to the introduction of large-scale shipping, whale sounds may have traveled from one side of an ocean to the other. Environmentalists fear that such boat activity is putting undue stress on the animals as well as making it difficult to find a mate.

In the past decade, many effective automated methods, such as signal processing, data mining, and machine learning techniques have been developed to detect and classify whale vocalizations.

== History ==
Prior to sonar technology becoming heavily used in World War II submarine warfare, the phenomenon of whale song was not widely known. Occasionally, before to the invention of propeller-driven boats, sailors aboard whaling vessels could hear the faint sounds of whales through hulls during extremely calm conditions. Whaling Captain Wm. H. Kelly was the first person known to recognize whale singing for what it was, while on the brig Eliza in the Sea of Japan in 1881.

In 1952, the earliest known recorded whale sounds were captured by O.W. Schreiber using hydrophone technology, while operating at a U.S. Navy SOFAR installation in Oʻahu, Hawaii. Schreiber hypothesized whales as the possible cause of the phenomenon, but identification would only later be confirmed by William E. Schevill.

Schevill had become an Associate in Physical Oceanography at Woods Hole Oceanographic Institution (WHOI) in Massachusetts during 1943, and his first work was under US Naval auspices investigating the echolocation of U-boats. As he later wrote in 1962: "During World War II many people on both sides listened to underwater sounds for military reasons. Not only the wanted sounds (those made by enemy ships), but a bewildering variety of others were heard. Most of these were ascribed to animals living in the sea, usually as 'fish noises' ... Some were ascribed to whales, in part correctly, but without identification of the kind of whale; most military listeners were not biologists, and in any case the traditional naval sonar room is woefully deficient in windows." Schevill produced recordings of underwater whale sounds and extrapolated their purpose from these recordings. His groundbreaking work produced over fifty papers on whale phonation and thus provided the framework for "literally hundreds of scientific studies produced by other workers from the 1960s until the present day." However, it is worthy of note that his wife Barbara Lawrence, Curator of Mammals at the Harvard Museum of Comparative Zoology (MCZ), often co-wrote these documents with him.

William E. Schevill's study of whales also at one point harked back to the U.S. Naval operations that first set him down this path. As noted upon his death by the Society for the Bibliography of Natural History, "Bill helped defuse a tense moment between the USA and Soviet Union during the Cold War. The US military suspected that low frequency blips were being used by the Soviets to locate American submarines, whereas Bill showed these were produced by fin whales (Balaenoptera physalus) hunting prey."

== Media ==
A humpback whale song

Common humpback whale vocalizations on a windy day

Orca calls and echolocation

Call of an orca

Orca echolocation

A fin whale song

A blue whale song
Recorded in the Atlantic (1)

A blue whale song
Recorded in the Atlantic (2)

A blue whale song
Recorded in North Eastern Pacific

A blue whale song
Recorded in the South Pacific

A blue whale song
Recorded in the West Pacific

An Atlantic minke whale

Atlantic minke whale pulse train
Recorded off South West Ireland April 2022

Humpback Whales and Dolphins calling.

Beluga whale vocalizations published by NOAA.

== Selected discography ==
- Songs of the Humpback Whale (SWR 118) was originally released in 1970 by CRM Records from recordings made by Roger Payne, Frank Watlington, and others. The LP was later re-released by Capitol Records, published in a flexible format in the National Geographic Society magazine, Volume 155, Number 1, in January 1979, re-released by Living Music/Windham Hill/BMG Records on CD in 1992, and remastered on CD by BGO-Beat Goes On in 2001.
- Deep Voices: The Second Whale Record (Capitol/EMI Records 0777 7 11598 1 0) was released on LP in 1977 from additional recordings made by Roger Payne, and re-released on CD in 1995 by Living Music/Windham Hill/BMG Records. It includes recordings of humpbacks, blues, and rights.
- Northern Whales (MGE 19) was released by Music Gallery Editions from recordings made by Pierre Ouellet, John Ford, and others affiliated with Interspecies Music and Communication Research. It includes recordings of belugas, narwhals, orca, and bearded seals.
- Sounds of the Earth: Humpback Whales (Oreade Music) was released on CD in 1999.
- Rapture of the Deep: Humpback Whale Singing (Compass Recordings) was released on CD in 2001.
- Songlines: Songs of the East Australian Humpback whales. was released in 2009.

== See also ==
- 52-hertz whale
- Bioacoustics
- Biomusic
- Underwater acoustics
- Vocal learning
