= Sperm whaling =

Human hunting of sperm whales

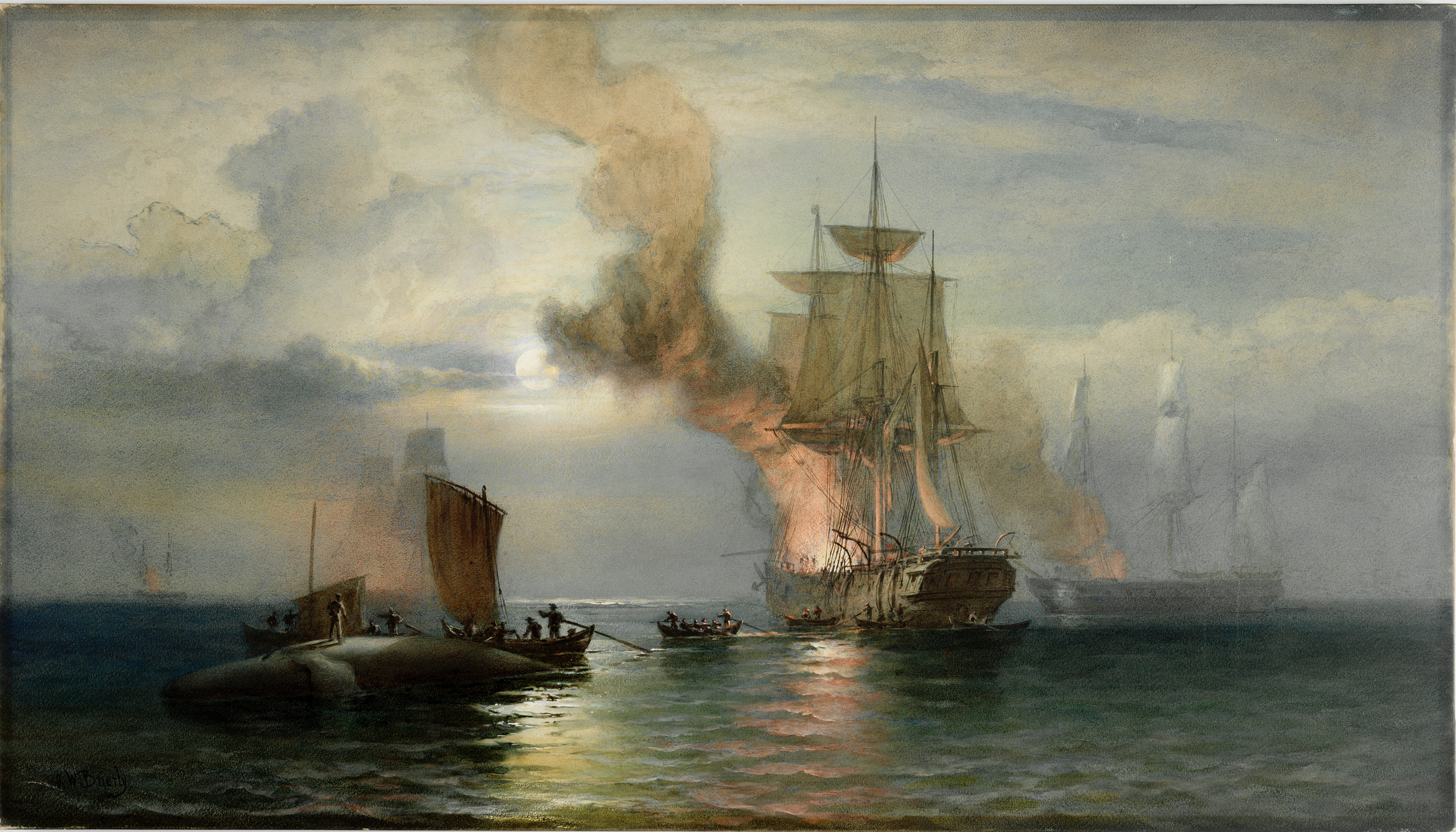
South Sea Whalers Boiling Blubber, by Sir Oswald Brierly, circa 1876. State Library of New South Wales.

Sperm whaling is the human practice of hunting sperm whales, the largest toothed whale, for the oil, meat and bone that can be extracted from the cetaceans' bodies.

Sperm whales are prized for the sperm oil, a waxy secretion that was especially popular as a lubricant and illuminant during the Industrial Revolution, and so they were heavily targeted in 19th-century commercial whaling, as exemplified in Moby Dick. Sperm oil has since been replaced by the cheaper kerosene-based products, but another unusual product, ambergris, is still valued as a perfume fixative. Although the animal is classified as a vulnerable species and commercial whaling has been banned since the 1970s, aboriginal whaling in limited numbers is still permitted for subsistence, notably from two villages in Indonesia.

== Economic motivation ==
The nose of the whale is filled with a waxy substance that was widely used in candles, oil lamps, and lubricants.

Sperm whales were hunted in the 19th century by American, British and other national whaling fleets. As with all the species targeted, the thick layer of fat (blubber) was flensed (removed from the carcass) and rendered, either on the whaling ship itself, or at a shore station. This was the whale oil, stored in casks for the long journey home. It was sold as a lamp fuel, not a food product; the whale meat was discarded. The other species that were within reach during the Age of Sail were filter-feeders, and their baleen had many commercial uses. The sperm whale, being a toothed hunter, lacked this so-called whalebone, but it did produce a valuable commodity: sperm oil.

Each whale's head held up to a ton, in a cavity called the "case". It was part of a waxy liquid called spermaceti, from which the whale got its common name. The liquid was removed from the spermaceti organ at sea, and stored separately from the rendered whale oil for processing back in port. On return home, this headmatter, which was worth around 20% more than the oil from the blubber, was divided into two valuable commodities. One was a very pure type of sperm whale oil that required little or no additional processing. It was found particularly suitable as a lubricant for fine machinery, such as pocket watches. What remained after the oil was extracted was a waxy substance that could be made into spermaceti candles. These burned longer and brighter than tallow candles and left no smell and, as a result, sold at a higher price. Although spermaceti by-products were high-value, they made up only a small proportion, perhaps 10%, of the substances extracted from sperm whales.

These much sought after commodities had a variety of commercial applications. In addition to the manufacture of candles, spermaceti was used in soap, cosmetics, machine oil, other specialized lubricants, lamp oil, paint, putty, pencils, crayons, leather waterproofing, rust-proofing materials and many pharmaceutical compounds.

Two other products of the sperm whale are of economic importance. Ambergris, a solid, waxy, flammable substance produced in their digestive system, was also sought as a fixative in perfumery. The whales' teeth were carved by sailors into scrimshaw art.

== History ==
Nantucket, in red, is an island off the state of Massachusetts where much sperm whaling originated

Historically, whaling took a heavy toll on sperm whale populations. Prior to the early 18th century, sperm whales were hunted in Japan and Indonesia. Legend has it that sometime in the early 18th century, supposed to be not far from 1712, Captain Christopher Hussey, while cruising for right whales near shore, was blown offshore by a northerly wind, where he encountered a school of sperm whales and killed one. It is not clear whether this story is apocryphal, since no Christopher Hussey would have been the proper age in 1712. However, another member of the Hussey family, possibly Bachelor (Bachelder) or Sylvanus Hussey, may have been the actual person referred to in the story. Although the story may not be true, sperm whales were indeed soon exploited by American whalemen, as Judge Paul Dudley, in his Essay upon the Natural History of Whales (1725), states that one Atkins, ten or twelve years in the trade, was among the first to catch sperm whales sometime around 1720.

=== Early 18th century ===
Only a few sperm whales were recorded to have been caught during the first few decades (1709–1730s) of offshore whaling, as sloops concentrated on Nantucket Shoals where they would have taken right whales or were sent to the Davis Strait region to catch bowhead whales. By the early 1740s, with the advent of spermaceti candles (before 1743), American vessels appear to have begun to take sperm whales in earnest. The diary of Benjamin Bangs (1721–1769) shows that, along with the bumpkin sloop he was in, he found three other sloops with sperm whales being flensed alongside off the coast of North Carolina in late May 1743. On returning to Nantucket in the summer 1744 on a subsequent sperm whaling voyage he noted that "45 spermacetes are brought in here this day," another indication that American sperm whaling was in full swing.

=== Late 18th century ===
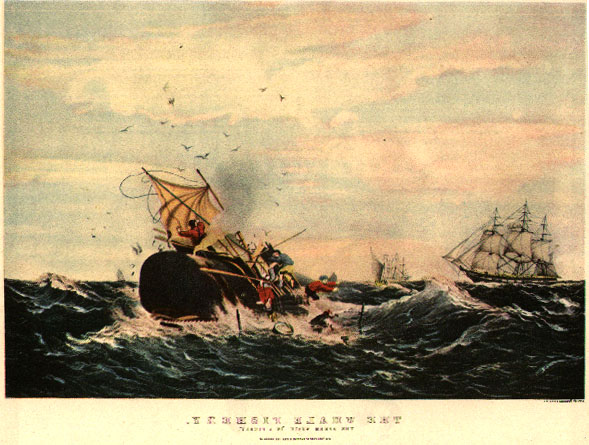
Sperm whaling

American sperm whaling soon spread from the east coast of the American colonies to the Gulf Stream, the Grand Banks, West Africa (1763), the Azores (1765) and the South Atlantic (1770s). From 1770 to 1775 Massachusetts, New York, Connecticut, and Rhode Island ports produced 45,000 barrels of sperm oil annually, compared to 8,500 of whale oil. In the same decade the British began sperm whaling, employing American ships and personnel. By the following decade the French had entered the trade, also employing American expertise. Sperm whaling increased until the mid-19th century, as spermaceti oil was important in public lighting (for example, in lighthouses, where it was used in the United States until 1862, when it was replaced by lard oil, which was quickly replaced by petroleum) and for lubricating the machines (such as those used in cotton mills) of the Industrial Revolution. Sperm whaling declined in the second half of the 19th century, as petroleum and other products began to replace spermaceti.

=== 19th century ===
Sperm whaling in the 18th century began with small sloops carrying only a pair of whaleboats (sometimes only one). As the scope and size of the fleet increased so did the rig of the vessels change, as brigs, schooners, and finally ships and barks were introduced. In the 19th century stubby, square-rigged ships (and later barks) dominated the fleet, being sent to the Pacific (the first being the British whaleship Emilia, in 1788), the Indian Ocean (1780s), and as far away as the Japan grounds (1820; Syren) and the coast of Arabia (1820s), as well as Australia (1790s) and New Zealand (1790s).

Sperm whaling involved the above-named ships searching for sperm whales on certain "grounds," or areas where sperm whales were likely to be found, such as the "Western" Ground in the mid-North Atlantic or the "Offshore" Ground in the latitudes of 5–10 degrees south and 105–125 degrees west longitude. The whales were spotted from one of the several look-outs stationed at the mast-heads. When a whale was found, whaleboats would be lowered and a harpoon attached to a long line would be thrown into it. The whale would then drag the boats (the famous "Nantucket sleighride") until it was too tired to resist, at which point the crew would lance it to death.

A sperm whale is killed and stripped of its blubber and spermaceti.

Hunting for sperm whales during this period was a notoriously dangerous affair for the crews of the whaleboats. Although a properly harpooned sperm whale generally exhibited a fairly consistent pattern of attempting to flee underwater to the point of exhaustion (at which point it would surface and offer no further resistance), it was not uncommon for bull whales to become enraged and turn to attack pursuing whaleboats on the surface, particularly if it had already been wounded by repeated harpooning attempts. A commonly reported tactic was for the whale to invert itself and violently thrash the surface of the water with its fluke, flipping and crushing nearby boats.

Particularly massive sperm whale specimens have also proven willing (on rare occasions) to attack comparably sized whaleships. In the most famous example, on November 20, 1820, a huge bull sperm whale (purportedly 85-ft in length) rammed the 87-ft Nantucket whaler Essex twice, staving in the hull under the waterline and forcing the crew to abandon ship. After months adrift in lifeboats, the crew eventually resorted to cannibalism, with only 8 out of the 20 sailors surviving until rescue; a 21st sailor had jumped ship in South America before the attack. The bull was unwounded and unprovoked at the time of the attack, but the crew of the Essex was in the process of hunting several smaller females from a nearby pod. Recent analysis suggests that the commotion and the bull's possible extreme size may have caused it to falsely identify the similarly sized Essex as an intruding competitive male. Bull sperm whales, especially older, solitary bulls, are known to battle amongst themselves for dominance by ramming each other, with the heavy, spermaceti-filled head spaces providing the biological equivalent of a weighted boxing glove. Another proposed factor was the vibrations from repeated sledgehammer blows as the ship's hull was being repaired prior to the attack, which scientists suggest might have carried into the water and unintentionally mimicked the echolocation "clicks" that sperm whales generate to identify and communicate with each other.

Another recorded case of a sperm whale attacking a large ship is that of the New Bedford whaleship Ann Alexander which was rammed and sunk by a wounded and enraged bull off the Galapagos Islands whaling grounds in 1851, just miles from the spot where the Essex had been sunk 31 years prior. The large and unusually aggressive bull had already attacked and chewed to pieces two pursuing whaleboats before eventually turning on the Ann Alexander itself and ramming it just above the keel at an estimated speed of 15 knots. The crew were forced to abandon ship, but unlike the Essex all were recovered safely within days. The bull (whose unusual aggressiveness was eventually blamed on old age and pain from disease) was later discovered floating on the surface, mortally injured and "full of wooden splinters" from the attack. American writer Herman Melville was inspired by the account of the Essex, and used some facts from the story, as well as his own eighteen-month experience as a sailor aboard a commercial whaler, to write his epic 1851 novel on the oil whaling industry, Moby Dick. The sections in Moby Dick on the biology of the sperm whale were largely based on books by Thomas Beale (1839) and Frederick Bennett (1840).

=== 20th century ===
Whaling activity declined from the 1880s until 1946, but picked up again after World War II. Modern whaling was more efficient than open-boat whaling, using steam and then diesel powered ships and exploding harpoons. Initially, modern whaling activity focused on large baleen whales, but as these populations were decimated, sperm whaling increased. Cosmetics, soap and machine oil formed the major uses of sperm whale products during this time. Sperm whale oil was still in use in automobile transmission cooling units in the United States in the 1970s.

In modern whaling, after the oil had been extracted the meat was usually ground down into a meal for feeding livestock. After sperm whale populations declined significantly, the species was given full protection by the International Whaling Commission in 1985. Hunting of sperm whales by Japan in the northern Pacific Ocean continued until 1988.

=== 21st century ===
Sperm whales and other deep-sea species are still hunted from small open boats by hunters from two Indonesian villages, Lamalera and Lamakera. This is permitted under rules concerning aboriginal whaling.

== Effect on sperm whale population ==
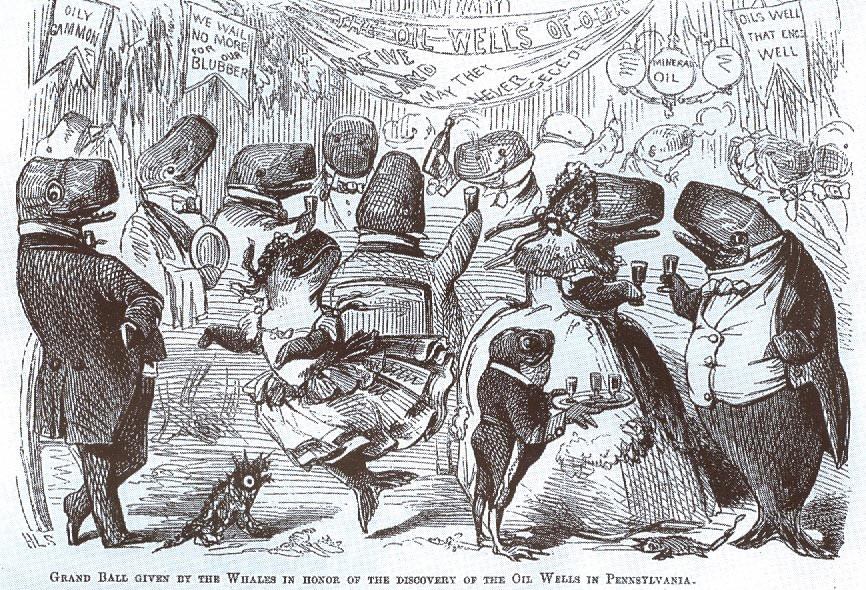
An 1861 cartoon showing sperm whales celebrating the discovery of new petroleum wells in Pennsylvania. The proliferation of mineral oils reduced demand for their species' oil.

It is estimated that the historic worldwide sperm whale population numbered 1,100,000 before commercial sperm whaling began in the early 18th century. By 1880 it had declined an estimated 29 per cent. From that date until 1946 the population appears to have recovered somewhat as whaling pressure lessened, but after the Second World War, with the industry's focus again on sperm whales, the population declined even further to only 33 per cent. It has been estimated that in the 19th century between 184,000 and 236,000 sperm whales were killed by the various whaling nations, while in the modern era, at least 770,000 were taken, the majority between 1946 and 1980.

Remaining sperm whale populations are large enough so that the species' conservation status is vulnerable, rather than endangered. However, the recovery from the whaling years is a slow process, particularly in the South Pacific, where the toll on males of a breeding age was severe.

== Gallery ==
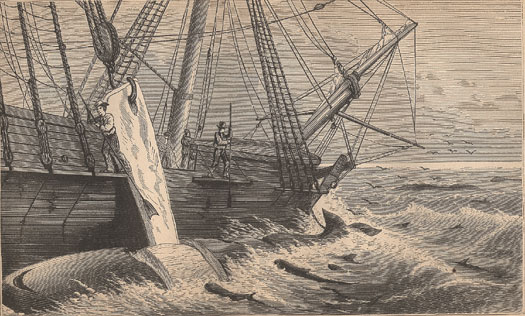
Whalers flensing blubber from a sperm whale.

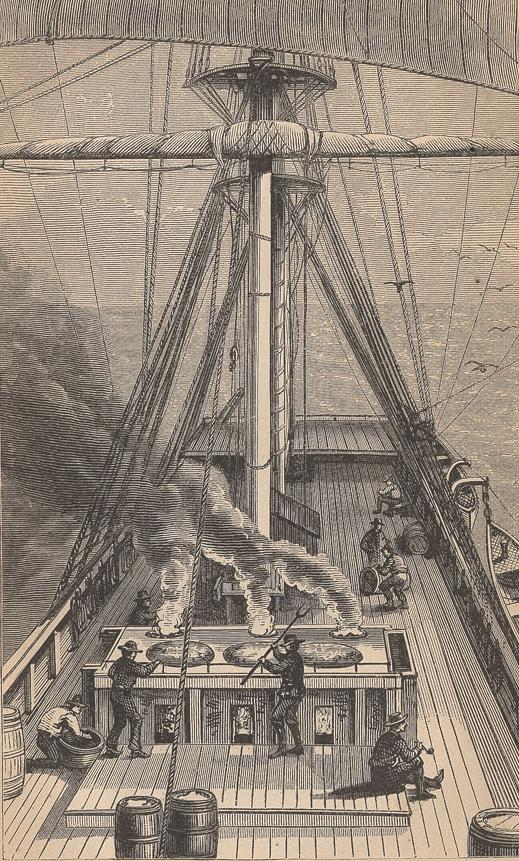
Whalers boiling blubber in a trypot on the deck of their ship (1874 illustration).

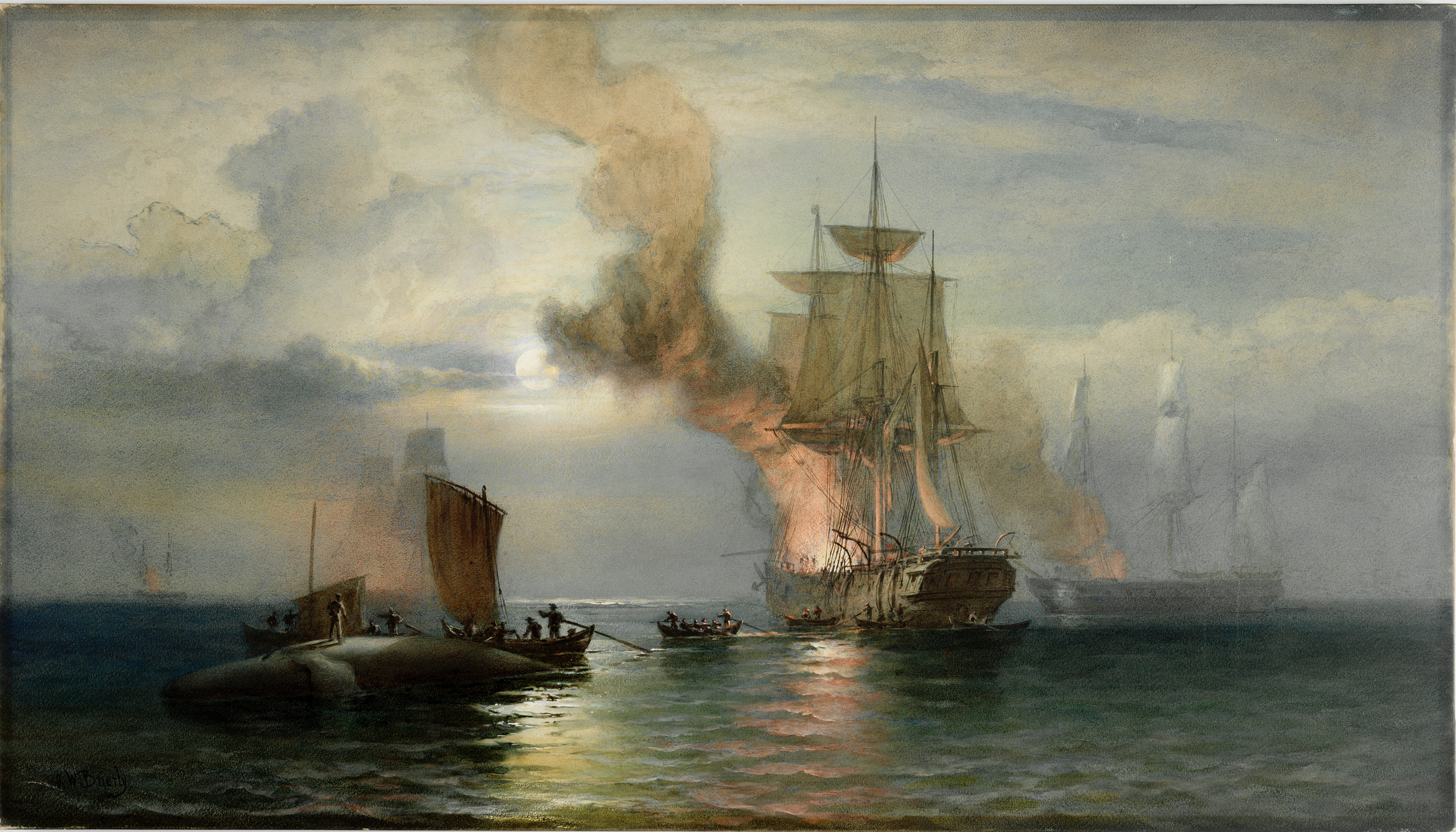
Oswald Brierly, South Sea whalers boiling blubber, c1876. Dixon Galleries, State Library of New South Wales.
