= Paledang =

Type of Indonesian sailing vessel from the Lesser Sunda Islands

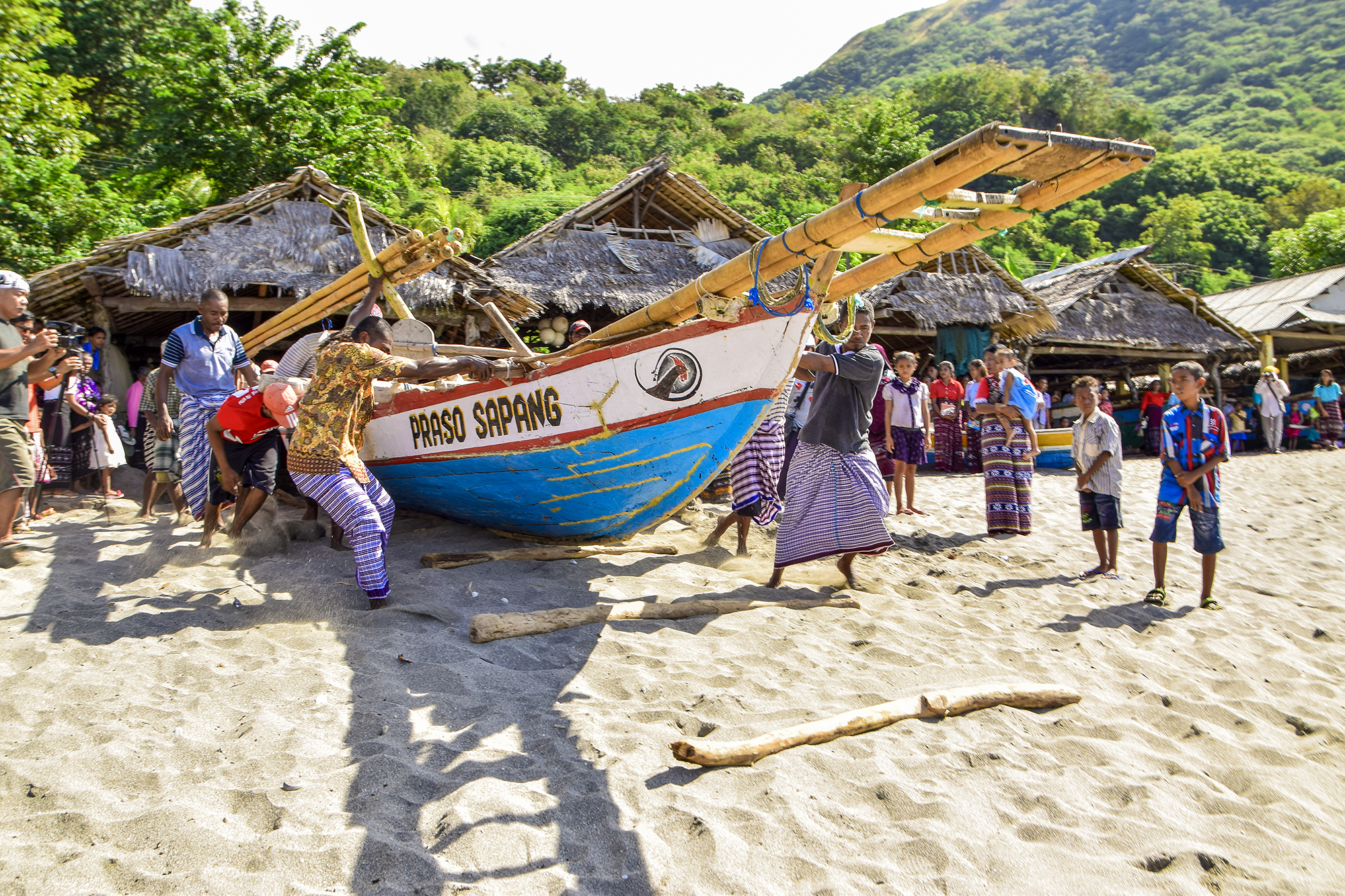
Pushing a peledang to the sea, Lamalera village, East Nusa Tenggara, 2019.

Paledang, peledang, or pledang is a type of Indonesian sailing vessel used for aboriginal whaling from the communities of Lamalera and Lamakera in the islands of Lembata and Solor, respectively. It is propelled by sails made from woven pandan leaves and by paddles. The boat is equipped with a bamboo harpoon, whose hook is attached to the boat using the "sacred rope" called leo, which is made from the leaves of the gebang palm (Corypha utan) and fiber from waru bark (Hibiscus tiliaceus). The boat's crew of around 6 to 10 people also wear a leo aka sacred rope made from cotton and turi bark (Sesbania grandiflora) for luck. The person tasked with the harpoon is called the Lamafa, a position of great importance. Alongside him is an assistant who handles the leo, who also has a high status along with the person who controls the boat (called the Tuan Perahu, lit. "boat master"). Paledang are made by traditional boat-makers called the Ata Molan. He decides on which part of a hunted whale goes to which crew member.

Until the late 90s, these boats were used exclusively for whale hunting, but in modern times, motorized boats called "Johnsons" are also being used.

== Gallery ==
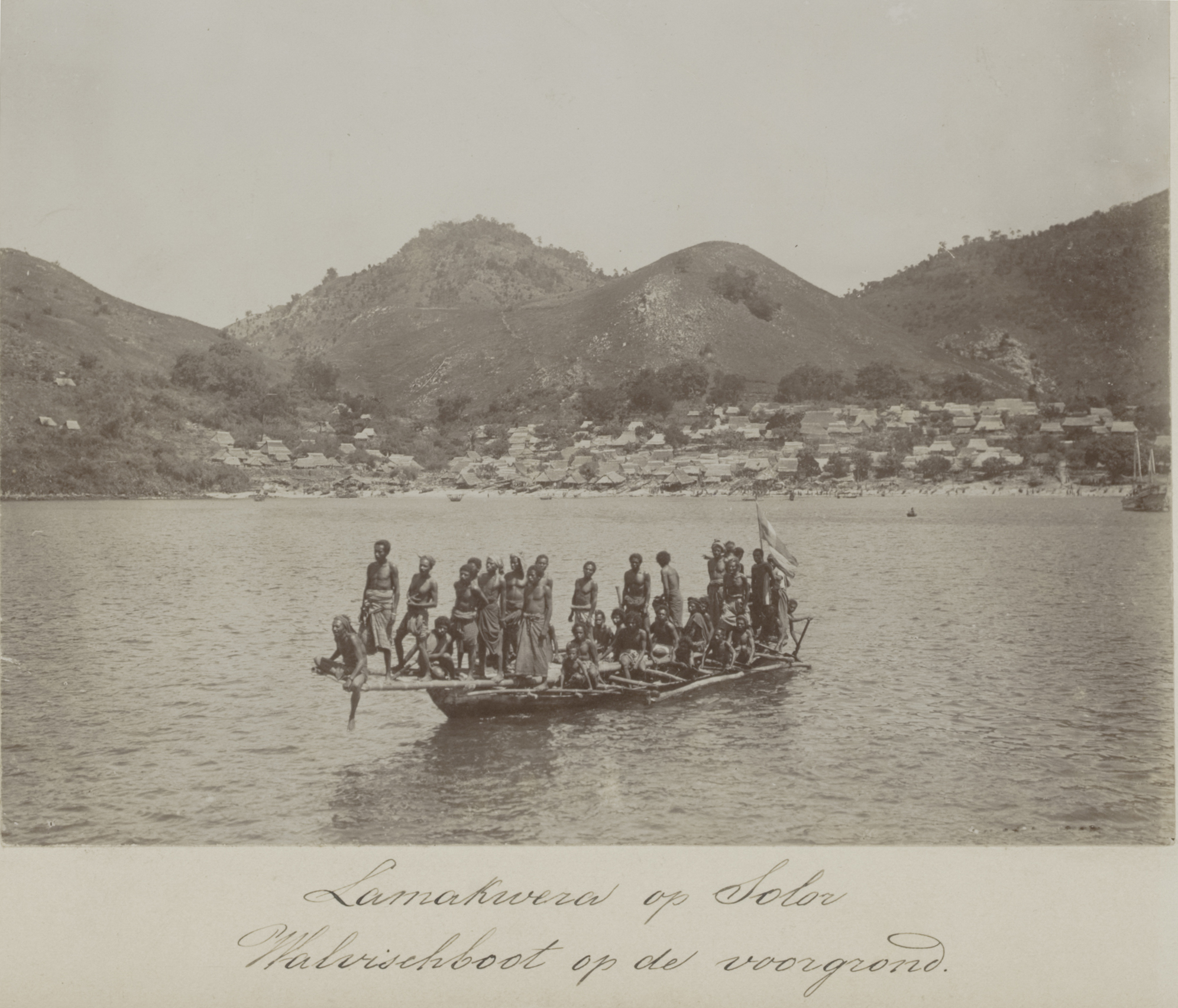
At the Lamakera village, Solor, 1899–1900.

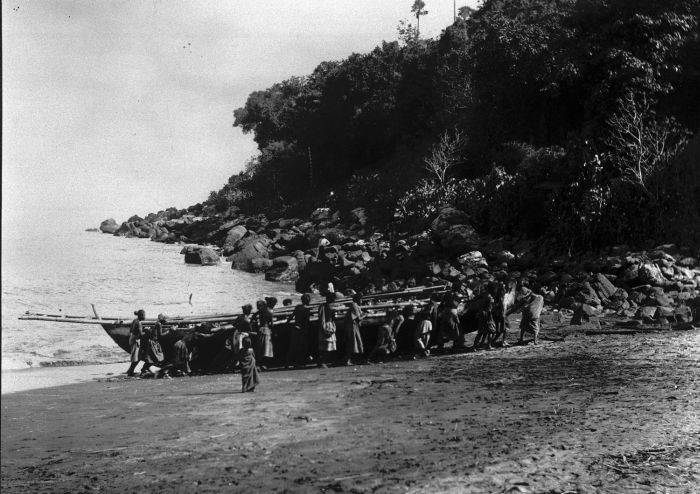
At Lomblen (Lembata) island, 1915.

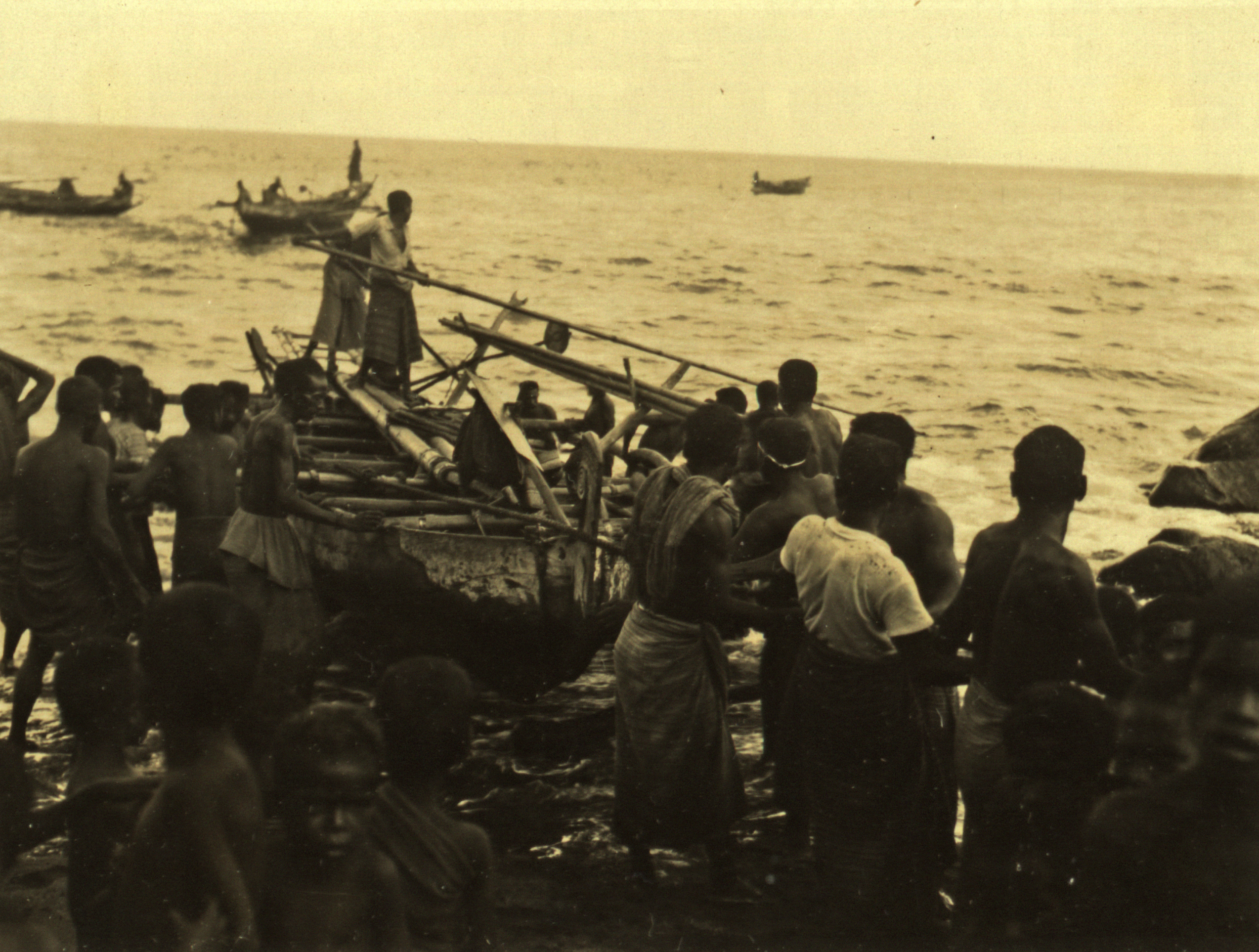
At the Lamalera village, Lomblen, 1929.

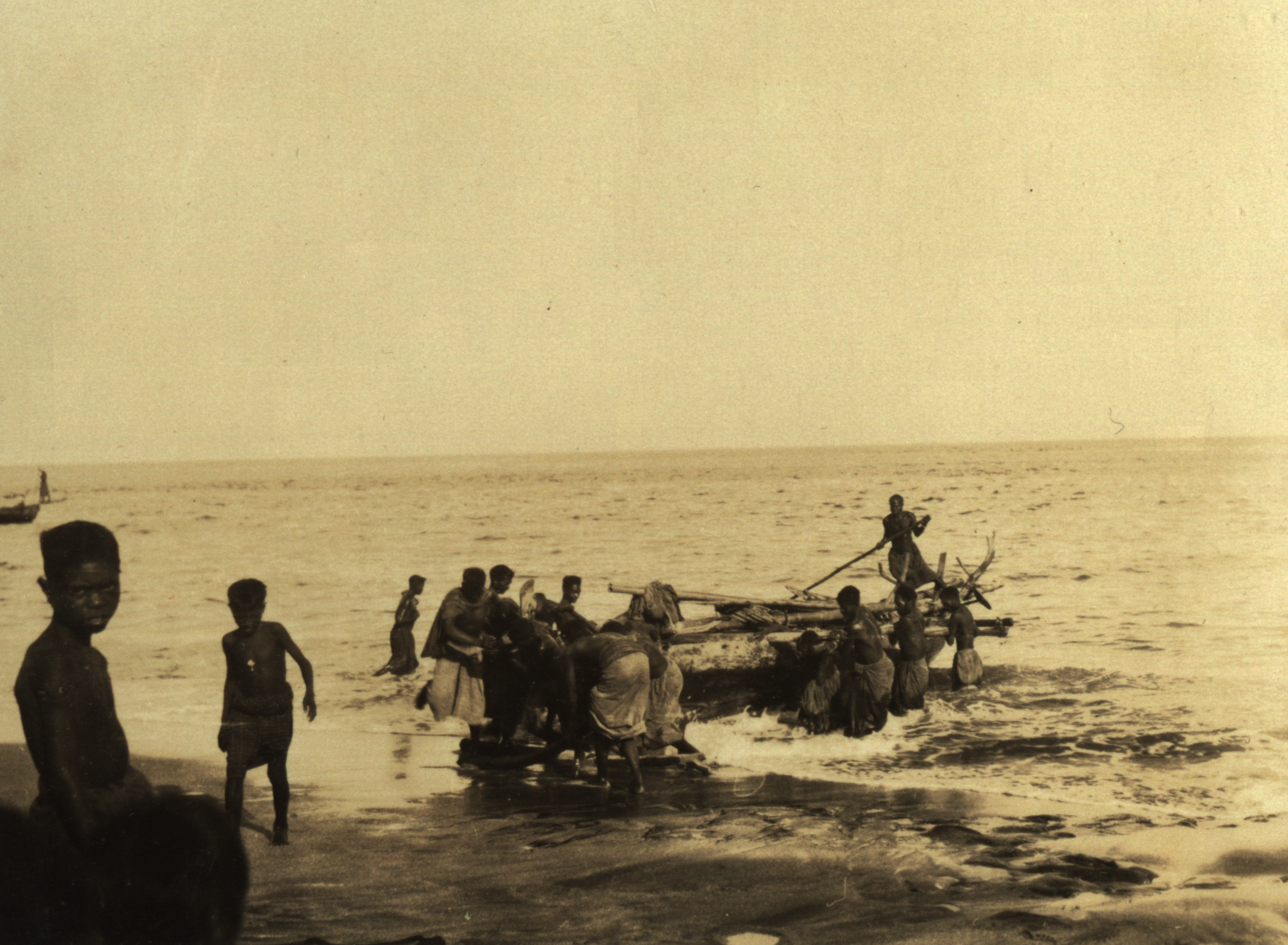
Launching the boat.

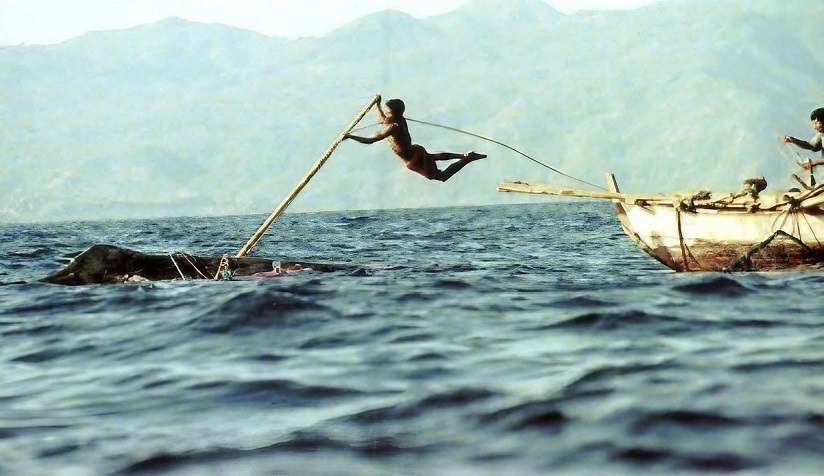
A lamafa (whale-spearer) jumps from peledang boat, spearing a whale.

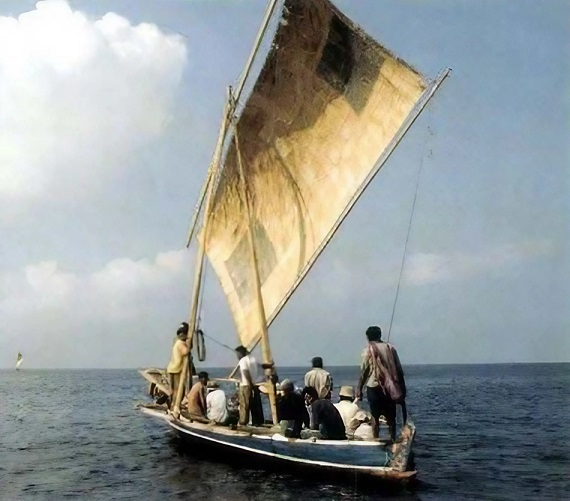
With unfurled tanja sail.

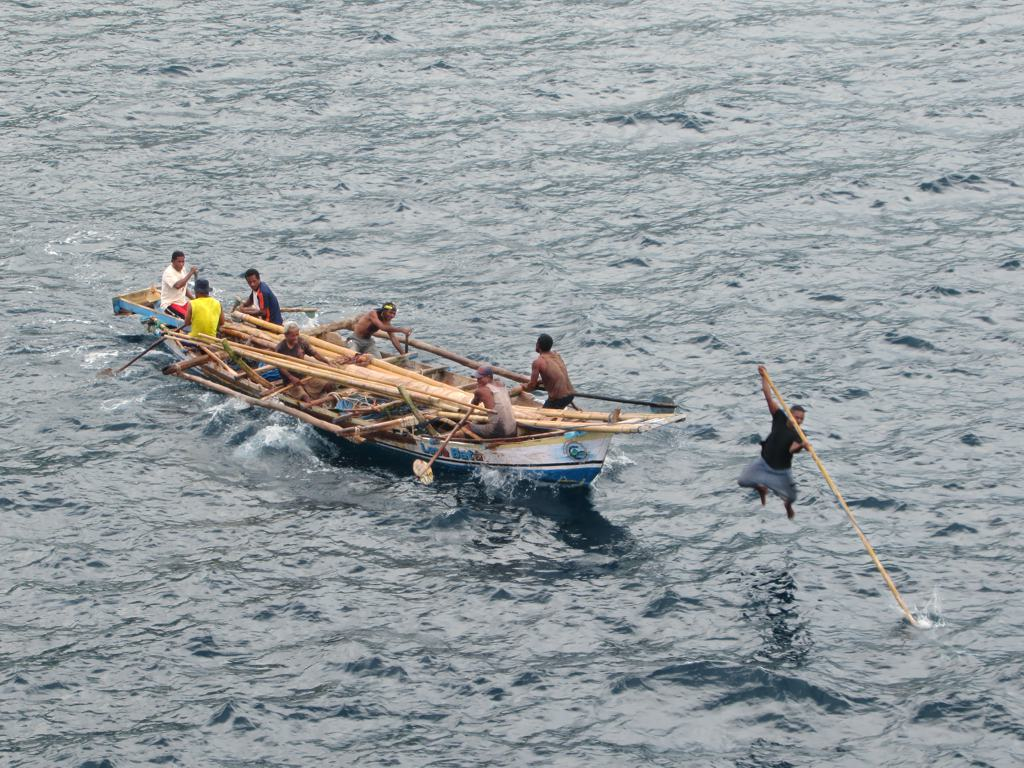
Harpooner jumps from a bowsprit.

== See also ==
- Whaleboat
