= Lemmer (whaling) =

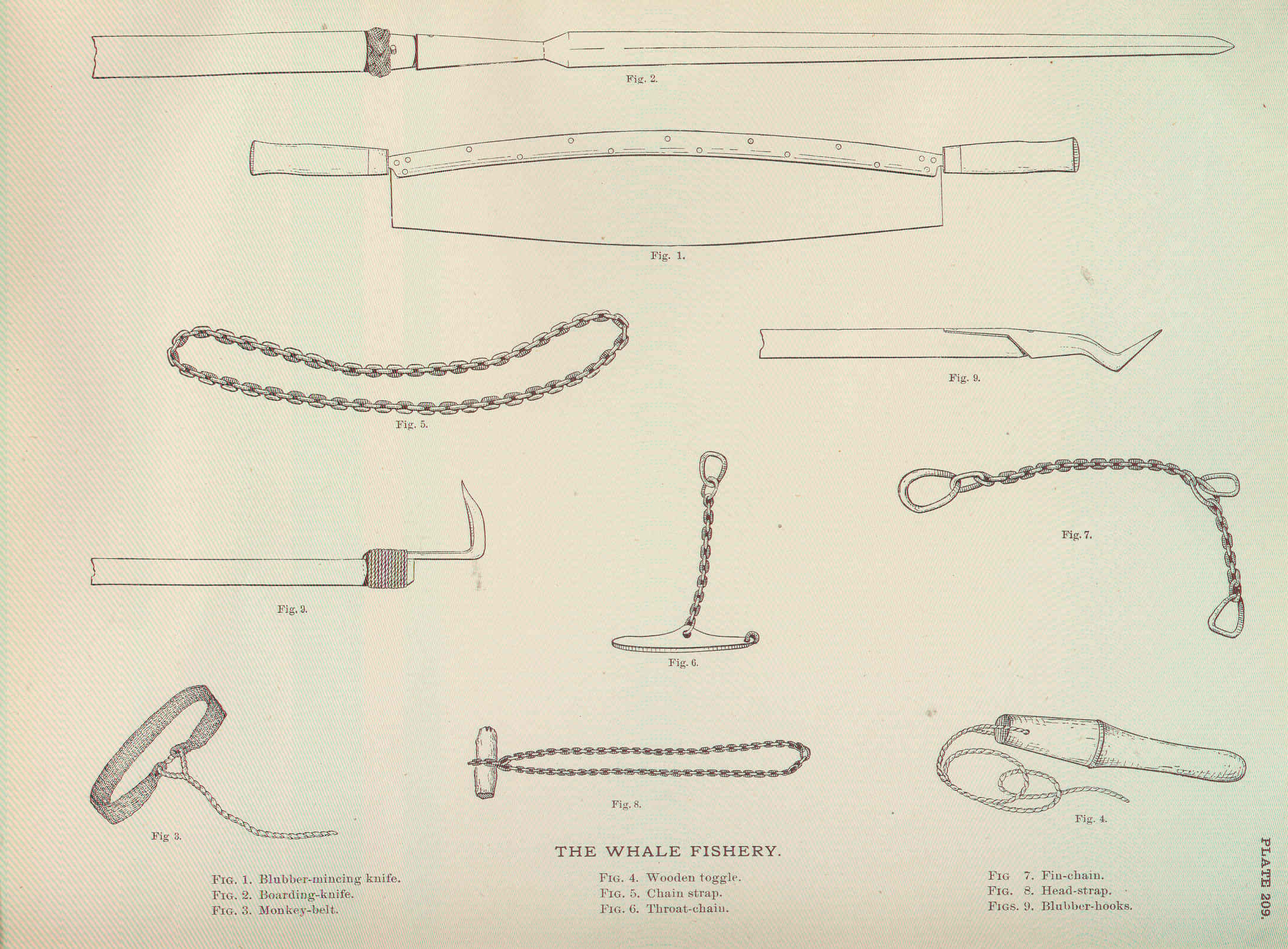
Illustration of tools used to process a whale

A lemmer is the person who dismembers a whale separating the meat, flippers, and bones in the butchering process after it has been stripped of blubber by a flenser. The lemmer removes the meat from the bones so it can be boiled to remove the whale oil. The word lemmer is from the Norwegian language word lemme, meaning dismember. On boats, the lemmer men separated the meat from the bones on the lemmer deck where the carcass was pulled.
