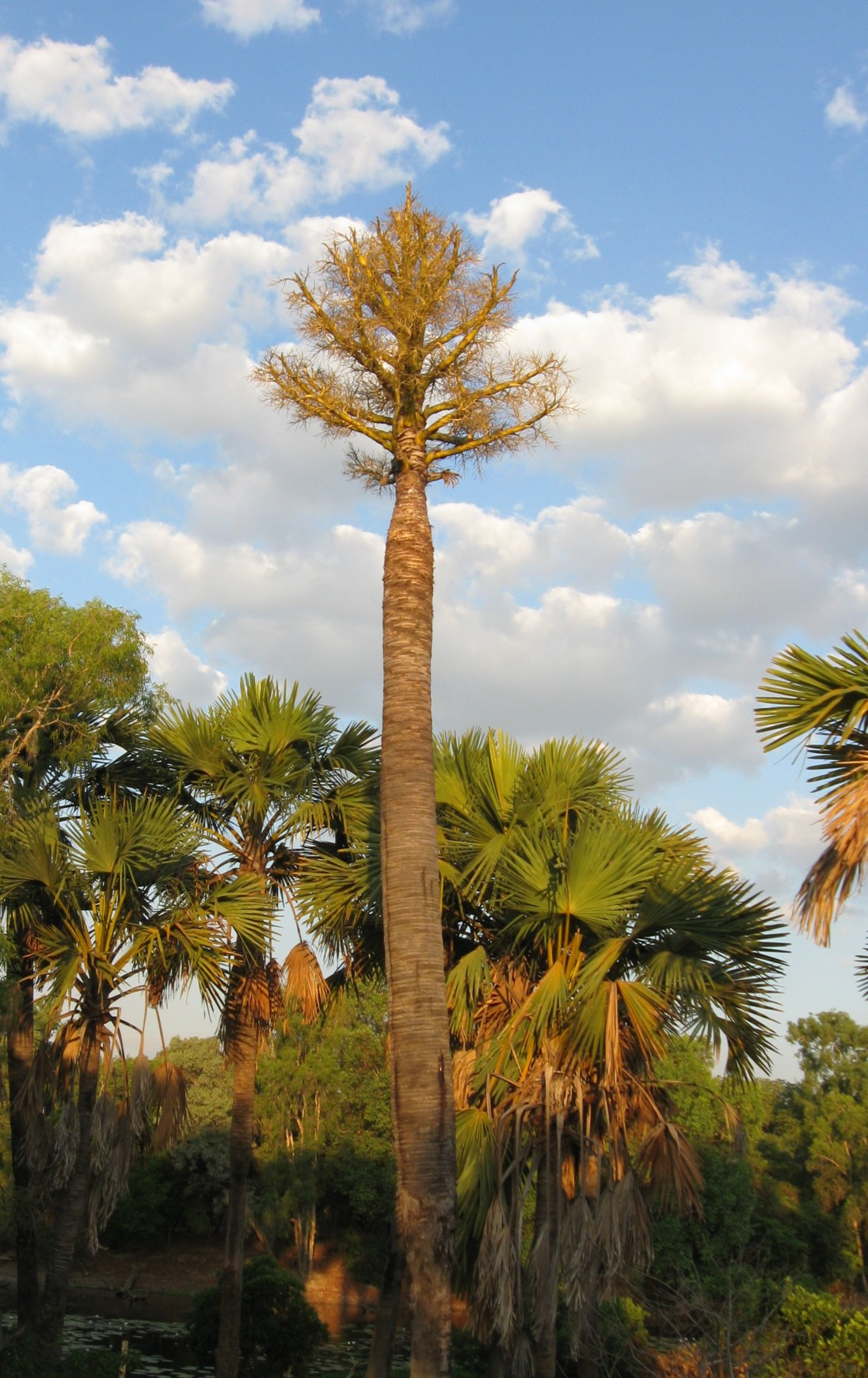
- At Kowanyama, Queensland

Scientific classification
- Kingdom: Plantae
- Clade: Embryophytes
- Clade: Tracheophytes
- Clade: Spermatophytes
- Clade: Angiosperms
- Clade: Monocots
- Clade: Commelinids
- Order: Arecales
- Family: Arecaceae
- Genus: Corypha
- Species: C. utan

Binomial name
- Corypha utan Lam.

Synonyms
- Borassus sylvestris Giseke nom. illeg.; Corypha elata Roxb.; Corypha gebang Mart.; Corypha gembanga (Blume) Blume; Corypha griffithiana Becc.; Corypha macrophylla Roster; Corypha macropoda Kurz; Corypha sylvestris Mart. nom. illeg.; Gembanga rotundifolia Blume; Livistona vidalii Becc.; Taliera elata (Roxb.) Wall.; Taliera gembanga Blume nom. illeg.; Taliera sylvestris Blume nom. illeg.

= Corypha utan =

Species of palm

Corypha utan, the cabbage palm, buri palm or gebang palm, is a species of palm native to Asia and Oceania.

== Description ==
It grows up to 20 metres (66 feet) tall, and, on the Cape York Peninsula of Queensland, up to 1.5 meters (4 feet 11 inches) thick (exceeded only by Borassus aethiopum and Jubaea chilensis) and bears palmate fronds 4 to 6 m (13 to 20 ft) long. Like other palms of the genus Corypha, this species flowers once at the end of its lifetime (monocarpy), producing a massive inflorescence up to 5 m tall containing up to one million flowers.

== Distribution and habitat ==
It is distributed from the Assam region of India through Indochina, Malaysia, and Indonesia to the Philippines and New Guinea, and south to Australia's Cape York Peninsula and Arnhem Land. Growing along watercourses, floodplains and grasslands, the Palm and Cycad Societies of Australia write about the Corypha utan palms occurring in Cape York:

Corypha utan .. is undoubtedly one of the most imposing species in the Australian palm flora (with its massive pachycaul trunks and hapaxanthic flowering and fruiting extravaganza.

== Uses ==
The starch contained inside the trunk is edible raw or cooked, as is the tip-top. The flowering stalks can be beaten to produce liquid. The nut kernels are also edible.

In Lamakera, its (ketebu) leaves are made into fibres weaved with sea hibiscus bark to make rope for whaling harpoons.

Locally known as buri or buli in the Philippines, the leaves of Corypha utan are widely used in weaving fans, baskets, and mats. Additionally, in Isla Verde, Batangas where this palm tree grows abundantly, Corypha utan sap is extracted, cooked and made into the sweet delicacy called "Pakaskas".
