= Whale oil =

Oil obtained from the blubber of whales

Whale oil is oil obtained from the blubber of whales. It was at one point an important fuel for illumination, as well as machine lubrication and other uses. Despite the increased availability of petroleum-based alternatives such as kerosene, whales and whale oil continued to be harvested well past the mid-20th century, although with the decline in commercial whaling its use has almost entirely ceased today.

== Source ==
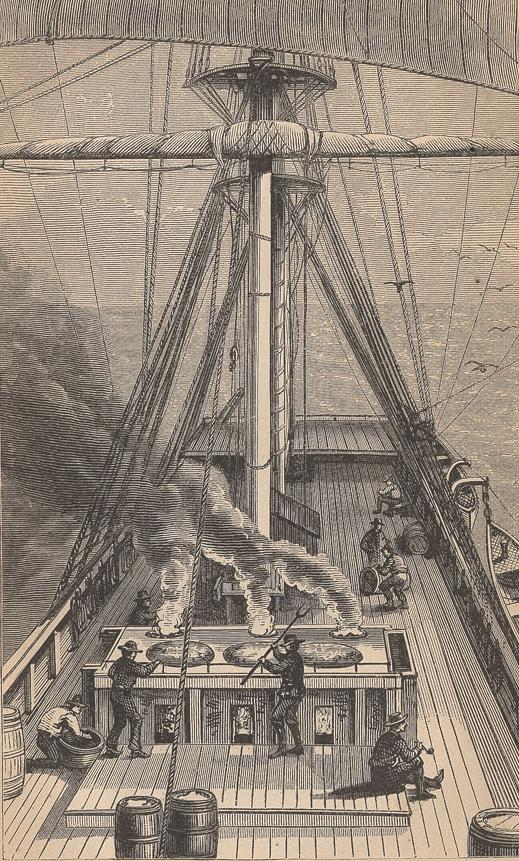
Whalers boiling blubber on the deck of their ship (1874 illustration)

Whale oil was obtained by boiling strips of blubber harvested from whales. The removal is known as flensing and the boiling process was called trying out. The boiling was carried out on land in the case of whales caught close to shore or beached. On longer deep-sea whaling expeditions, the trying-out was done aboard the ship in a furnace known as a trywork and the carcass was then discarded into the water.

Baleen whales were a major source of whale oil. Their oil is exclusively composed of triglycerides, whereas that of toothed whales contains wax esters. The bowhead whale and right whale were considered the ideal whaling targets. They are slow and docile, and they float when killed. They yield plenty of high-quality oil and baleen, and as a result, they were hunted nearly to extinction. Oil from the bowhead whale was sometimes known as train-oil, which comes from the Dutch word traan ("tear drop").

Sperm oil, a special kind of oil found in the head cavities of sperm whales, differs chemically from ordinary whale oil: it is composed mostly of liquid wax. Its properties and applications differed from those of detergentized whale oil, and it was sold for a higher price. A mass of cartilage and tissue called junk was also recovered from the heads of sperm whales.

A common misconception is that commercial development of the petroleum industry and vegetable oils saved whales from extinction. In fact, the development of petroleum accelerated the whaling industry, which peaked in the 1960s. Although petroleum quickly replaced whale oil in its most important applications, lubrication and lighting, and hence shrank the U.S. whaling industry from 320,000 to 1,800 barrels (1854 to 1905), other uses for whale parts were invented in, e.g., cosmetics and clothes. Then new substitutes and the scarcity of whales weakened the profitability of whaling.

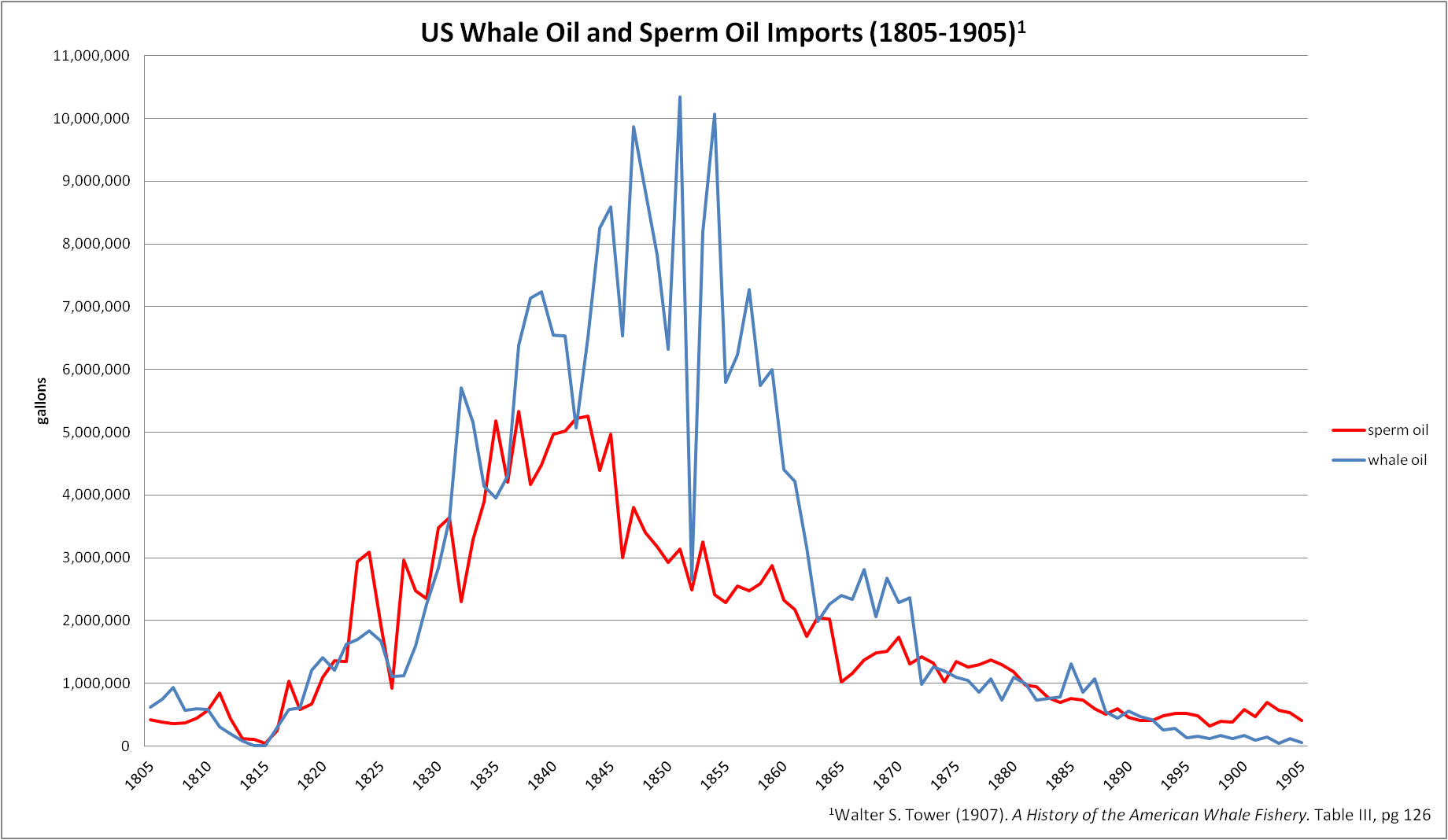
United States whale oil and sperm oil imports in the 19th century

In 1986, the International Whaling Commission declared a moratorium on commercial whaling, which has all but eliminated the use of whale oil today. Aboriginal whaling, part of the subsistence economy, is still permitted. Groups such as the Inuit of North America are granted special whaling rights, integral to their culture, and they still use whale oil as a food and as lamp oil in the ceremonial qulliq. A small amount of commercial whaling still occurs. In the 21st century, with most countries having banned whaling, the sale and use of whale oil has practically ceased.

== Chemistry ==
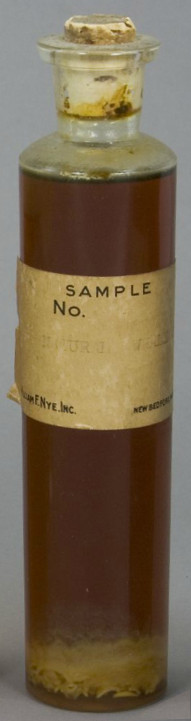
A bottle of whale oil

Whale oil has low viscosity (lower than olive oil), is clear, and varies in color from a bright honey yellow to a dark brown, according to the condition of the blubber from which it has been extracted and the refinement through which it went. It has a strong fishy odor. When hydrogenated, it turns solid and white and its taste and odor change. Its composition varies with the species from which it was sourced and the method by which it was harvested and processed. It is composed mainly of triglycerides (molecules of fatty acids attached to a glycerol molecule). Oil sourced from toothed whales, especially the oil of sperm whales, contains a substantial amount of wax esters. Most of the fatty acids are unsaturated. The most common fatty acids are oleic acid and its isomers (18:1 carbon chains). Whale oil is exceptionally stable.

Physical properties of whale oils
| Specific gravity | 0.920 to 0.931 at 15.6 °C (60.1 °F) |
| Flash point | 230 °C (446 °F) |
| Saponification value | 185–202 |
| Unsaponifiable matter | 0–2% |
| Refractive index | 1.4760 at 15 °C (59 °F) |
| Iodine value (Wijs) | 110–135 |
| Viscosity | 35–39.6 cSt at 37.8 °C (100.0 °F) |

== Applications ==
The main use of whale oil was for illumination and machine lubrication.

=== Illumination ===
Emerging industrial societies used whale oil in oil lamps. In the eighteenth-century Vauxhall Gardens was lit with whale oil lamps and huge quantities were needed. Whale oil was used for lamps because it burned with less smoke and brighter than the alternatives although a major disadvantage was the fishy smell. Whale oil was a valuable commodity and frequently stolen by the staff either for their own use or to sell outside the gardens. In the 1740s, five thousand street lamps which burned whale oil were located in London.

Cheaper alternatives to whale oil existed, but were inferior in performance and cleanliness of burn. As a result, whale oil dominated the world for both uses. This in turn further fueled the Industrial Revolution, in the United States, in Britain, and continental Europe.

In the United States, as demand for whale oil increased at the end of the 18th century, the whaling industry expanded until its peak around the 1860s, when piped coal-gas networks began to provide an alternative lighting fuel in urban areas. Due to dwindling whale populations causing higher voyage costs, as well as taxation, the market changed rapidly in the 1860s after the discovery of mineral oils and expansion of chemical refineries to produce kerosene and lubricants. By 1870, kerosene became the dominant illumination fuel and the US whaling industry was in decline.

Whale oil was used as a cheap illuminant, though it gave off a strong odor when burnt and was not very popular. It was replaced in the late 19th century by cheaper, more efficient, and longer-lasting kerosene. Burning fluid and camphine were the dominant replacements for whale oil until the arrival of kerosene.

=== Lubrication ===
In the United Kingdom, whale oil was used in toolmaking machinery as a high-quality lubricant. Sperm whale oil was particularly valued, and was used to lubricate some components of the Apollo lunar modules, as well as intercontinental ballistic missiles. It was also used in automobile transmission fluid for its rust-resistant qualities. General Motors in 1975 reported problems with corrosion in thousands of transmissions and radiators, and blamed it on switching in 1973 to a new transmission oil formula without whale oil.

=== Other uses ===
- After the invention of hydrogenation in the early 20th century, whale oil was used to make margarine, a practice that has since been discontinued. Whale oil in margarine has been replaced by vegetable oil.
- Whale oil was used to make soap. Until the invention of hydrogenation, it was used only in industrial-grade cleansers, because its foul smell and tendency to discolor made it unsuitable for cosmetic soap.
- Whale oil was widely used in the First World War as a preventive measure against trench foot. An infantry battalion of the British Army during World War I on the Western Front could be expected to use 10 imp gal (45 L; 12 US gal) of whale oil a day. The oil was rubbed directly onto bare feet in order to protect them from the effects of immersion.

== Gallery ==
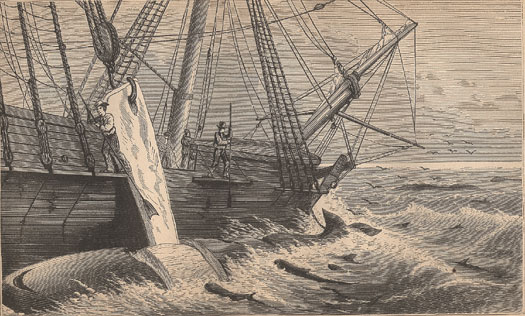
Whalers stripping blubber from a whale

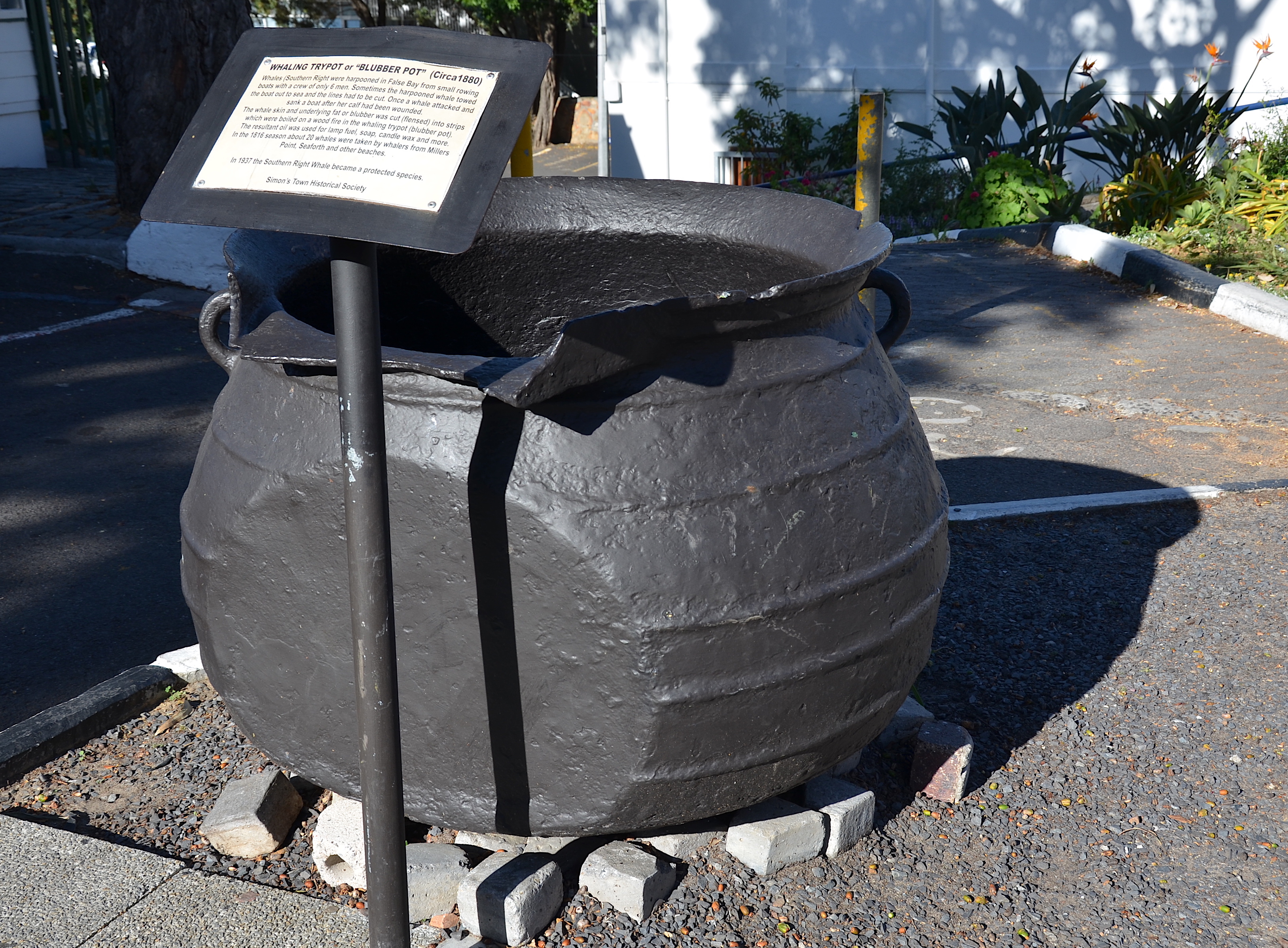
Try pot or Blubber Pot seen in Simon's Town in South Africa

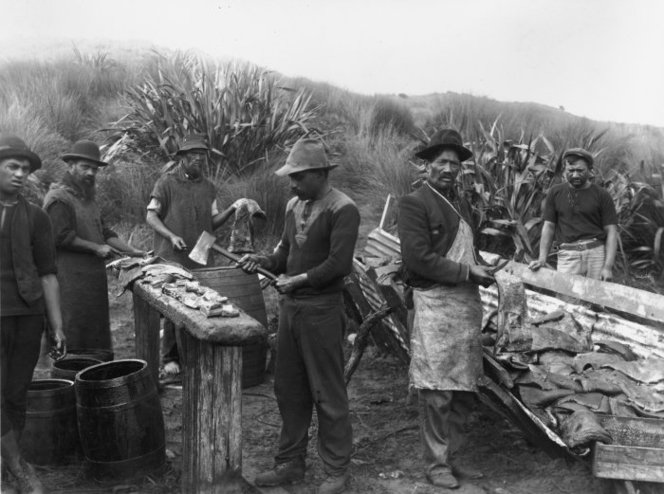
Māori people cutting up the blubber of beached pilot whales (Te Ārai, New Zealand, 1911)

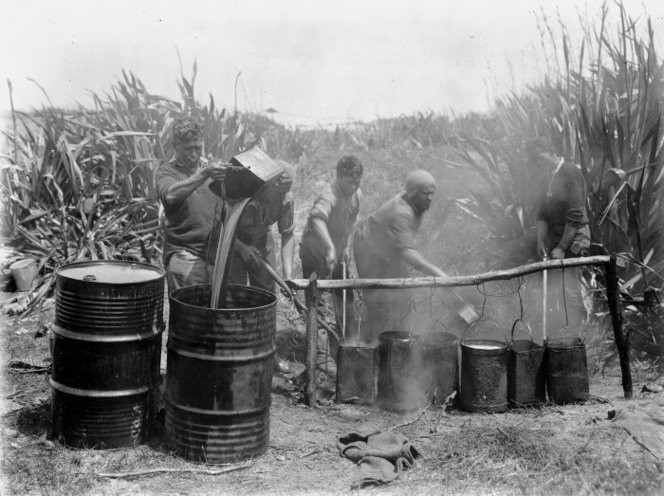
Men boiling the blubber of a beached blackfish at Tokerau Beach. (New Zealand, 1911)

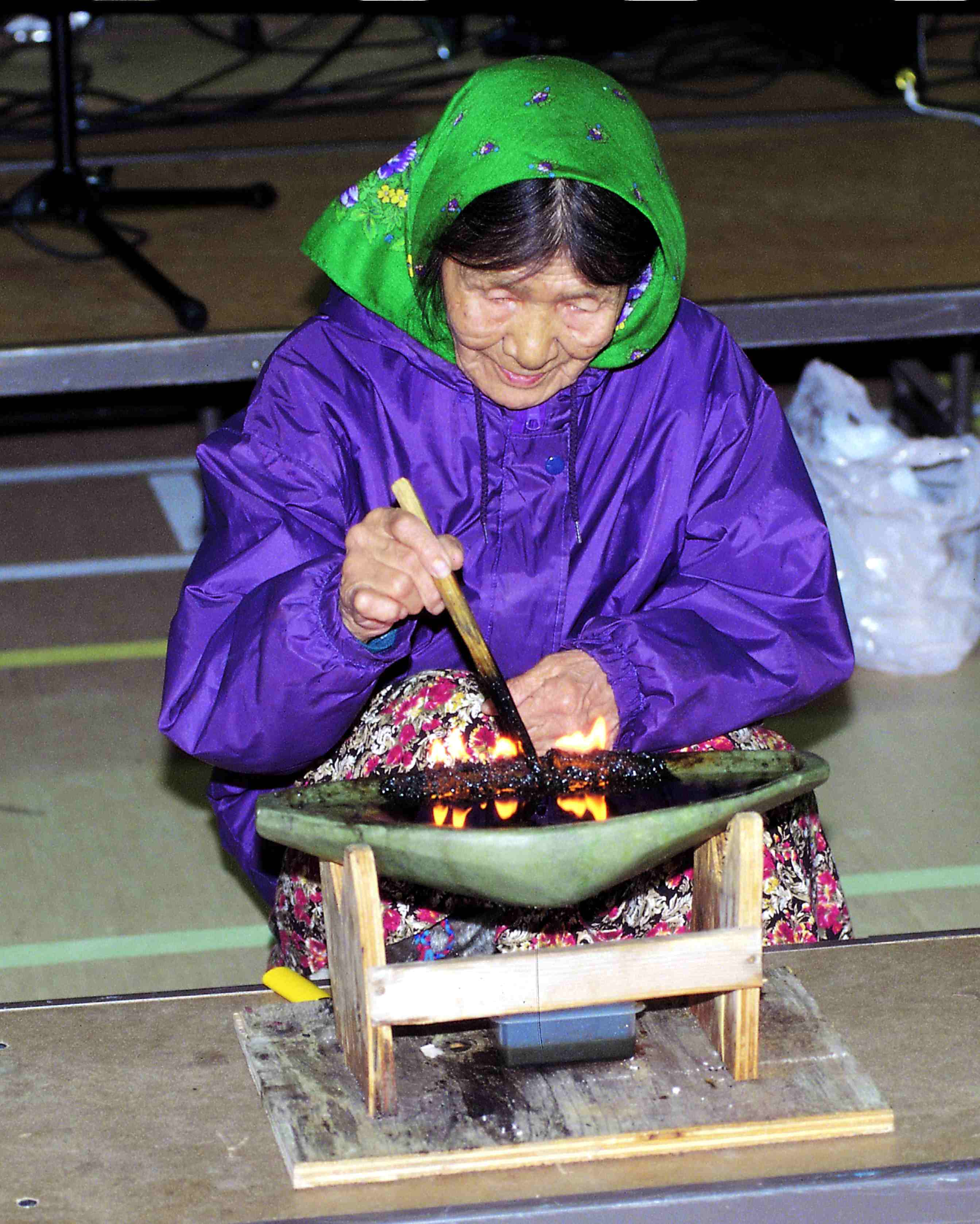
An Inuk woman tending a qulliq, a traditional whale, or seal, oil lamp (Nunavut, Canada, 1999)

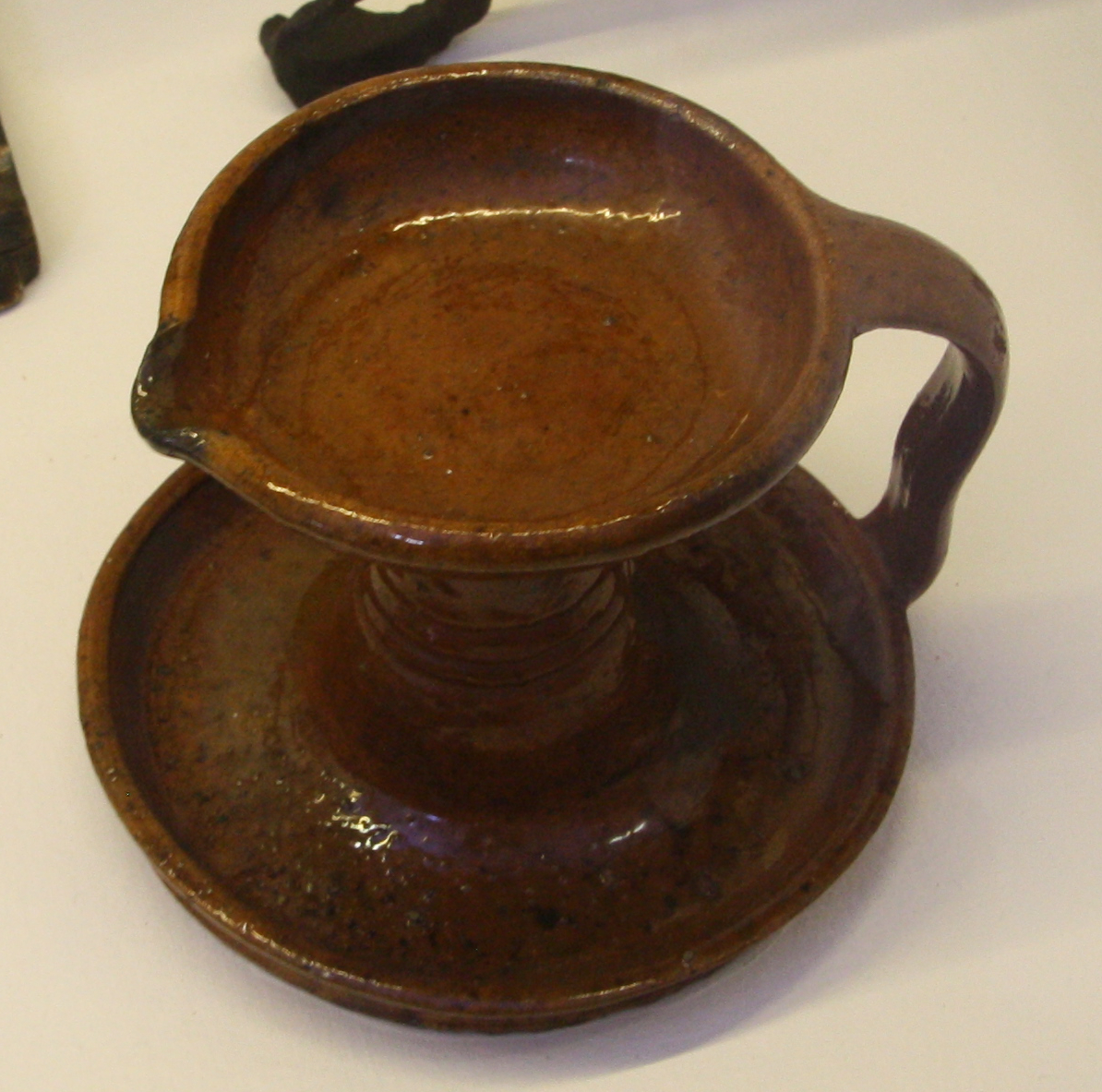
Whale oil lamp in brown-glazed earthenware with candle bowl for the wick and base drip pan. Lyse parish, Bohuslän – now in the Nordic Museum, Stockholm, Sweden

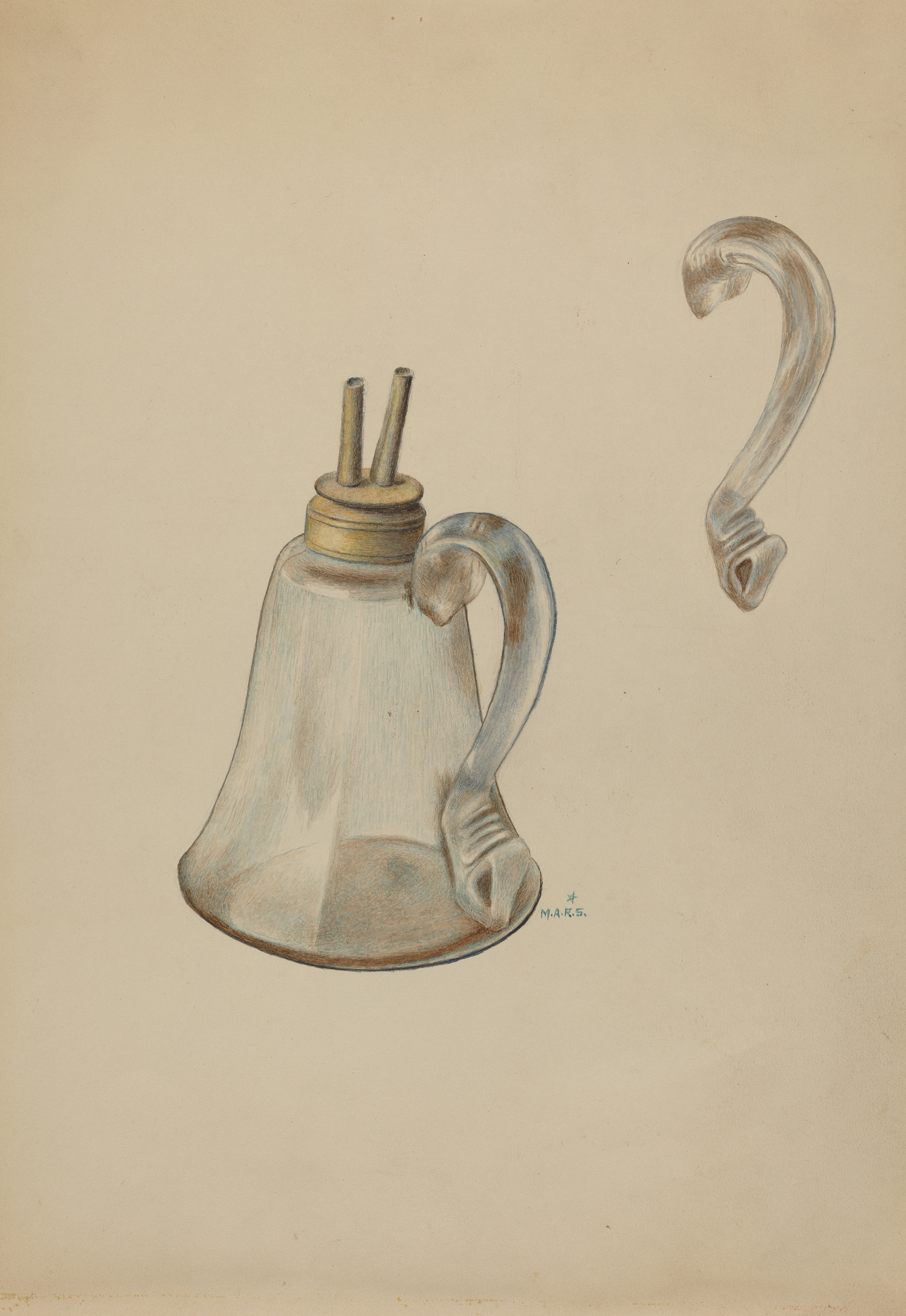
Watercolor rendering of a glass whale oil lamp manufactured in New England in the late 18th-century or early 19th century; National Gallery of Art, 1936.

== In literature and art ==
The pursuit and use of whale oil, along with many other aspects of whaling, are discussed in Herman Melville's 1851 novel, Moby-Dick. The novel's narrator is sometimes misquoted as saying that whale oil is "as rare as the milk of queens". The quote is:

In merchantmen, oil for the sailor is more scarce than the milk of queens.

— Herman Melville, Moby-Dick

According to the rest of the paragraph, sailors onboard the merchantman had to sleep, dress, and maneuver below decks in the dark as opposed to the whalers who used the oil for light.

John R. Jewitt, an Englishman who wrote a memoir about his years as a captive of the Nuu-chah-nulth (Nootka), an Indigenous Pacific Northwest people on the British Columbia Coast, from 1802 to 1805, claimed whale oil was a condiment with every dish, even strawberries.

In Robert Browning's Pied Piper (§ VII), the Piper's piping leads the rats to imagine the sound of "breaking the hoops of train-oil flasks".

Friedrich Ratzel in The History of Mankind (1896), when discussing food materials in Oceania, quoted Captain James Cook's comment in relation to the Māori people: "No Greenlander was ever so sharp set upon train-oil as our friends here, they greedily swallowed the stinking droppings when we were boiling down the fat of dog-fish."

In the video games Dishonored and Dishonored 2, whale oil is used as an important source of electricity.

== See also ==
- Oleochemistry
- Rendering (animal products)
- Seal oil
- Spermaceti
- Sperm whaling
