= Try-works =

Furnace for rendering blubber into whale oil

A try-works, also try works and tryworks, is a furnace used to heat blubber from whales for the recovery of oil on a whaling ship.

The try-works is located abaft the forehatch. It is constructed of brick and attached to the deck with iron braces. Two cast-iron try-pots are set into the furnace. A reservoir of water under the bricks keeps the furnace from scorching the wood of the deck. The process of removing oil from blubber is known as "trying out". It is similar to the rendering process for producing lard by heating or frying fatty pork.

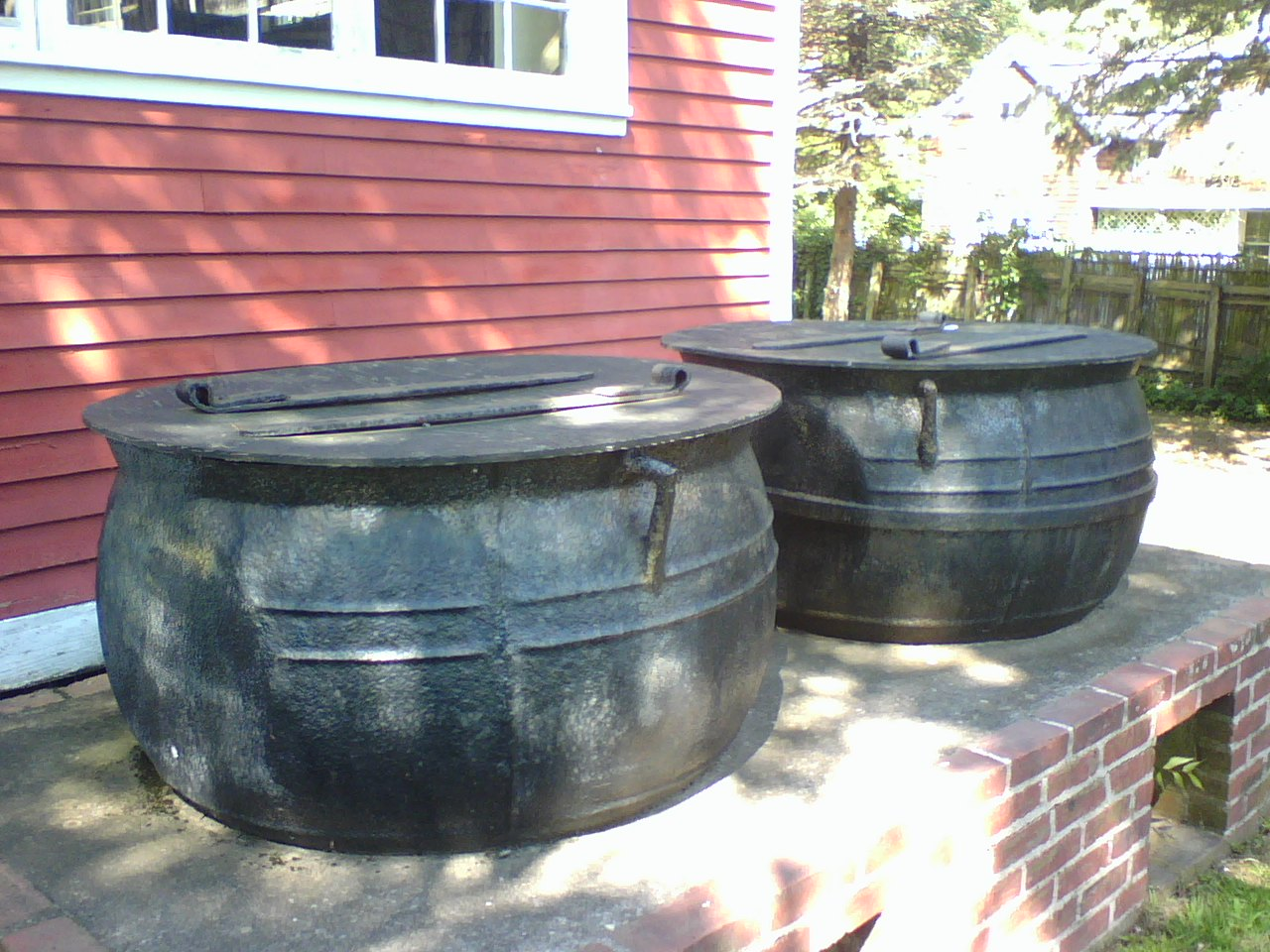
Try-pots on display at the Southampton Historical Museum in South Hampton, New Hampshire.

== Context ==
Early in the history of whaling, vessels had no means to process blubber at sea and had to bring it into port for processing. Later, whaling vessels carried a try-works, a brick furnace with a pair of try-pots built onto the deck. The try-works was constructed aboard the vessel before it left port. Once the ship's whaling had been completed, the brickwork was broken up and thrown overboard before the ship returned to port.

In the 18th and 19th century New England whaling industry, ships equipped with try-works could stay at sea longer, since they could boil out the oil during voyages and thus avoid having to carry raw blubber home. Slices of blubber were cut as thinly as possible for the process, and on New England whaling ships, these slices were known as "bible leaves" by the sailors. The ability of ships to use try-works at sea enabled the whaling industry to flourish.

== Try-pot ==
Try-pots, which are cauldrons or huge pots, vary in size. In the 1840s, at the peak of the whaling industry, five sizes were available ranging from 140-gallon to 220-gallon capacities. They were used to render oil from blubber obtained from cetaceans (whales and dolphins) and pinnipeds (seals), and also to extract oil from penguins. Once a suitable animal such as a whale had been caught and killed, the blubber was stripped from the carcass in a process known as flensing, cut into pieces, and melted in the try-pots to extract the oil. Once the pots were full, any solid residue was removed and the oil was poured into barrels or casks for storage in the ship's cargo hold.
