= Rendering (animal products) =

Conversion of waste animal tissue

Rendering is any process that converts waste animal tissue into stable, usable materials. Rendering can refer to any processing of animal products into more useful materials, or, more narrowly, to the rendering of whole animal fatty tissue into purified fats like lard or tallow. Rendering can be carried out on an industrial, farm, or kitchen scale. It can also be applied to non-animal products that are rendered down to pulp. The rendering process simultaneously dries the material and separates the fat from the bone and protein, yielding a fat commodity and a protein meal.

== Input sources ==
In animal products, the majority of tissue processed comes from slaughterhouses, but also includes restaurant grease, butcher shop trimmings, and expired meat from grocery stores. This material can include the fatty tissue, bones, and offal, as well as entire carcasses of animals condemned at slaughterhouses and those that have died on farms, in transit, etc. The most common animal sources are beef, pork, mutton, and poultry.

== Process variations ==
The rendering process varies in a number of ways:

- Whether the end products are used as human or animal food depends on the quality of input material and the processing methods and equipment.
- The material may be processed by wet or dry means.
  - In wet processing, either boiling water or steam is added to the material, separating fat into a floating phase.
  - In dry processing, fat is released by dehydrating the raw material.
- The temperature range used may be high or low.
- Rendering may be done either in discrete batches or in a continuous process.
- The processing plant may be operated by an independent company that buys input material from suppliers, or by a packing plant that produces the material in-house.

=== Edible products ===
Edible rendering processes are basically meat processing operations and produce lard or edible tallow for use in food products. Edible rendering is generally carried out in a continuous process at low temperature (less than the boiling point of water). The process usually consists of finely chopping the edible fat materials (generally fat trimmings from meat cuts), heating them with or without added steam, and then carrying out two or more stages of centrifugal separation. The first stage separates the liquid water and fat mixture from the solids. The second stage further separates the fat from the water. The solids may be used in food products, pet foods, etc., depending on the original materials. The separated fat may be used in food products, or if in surplus, may be diverted to soap making operations. Most edible rendering is done by meat packing or processing companies.

=== Inedible products ===
Materials that for aesthetic or sanitary reasons are not suitable for human food are the feedstocks for inedible rendering processes. Much of the inedible raw material is rendered using the "dry" method. This may be a batch or a continuous process in which the material is heated in a steam-jacketed vessel to drive off the moisture and simultaneously release the fat from the fat cells. The material is first ground, then heated to release the fat and drive off the moisture, percolated to drain off the free fat, and then more fat is pressed out of the solids, which at this stage are called "cracklings" or "dry-rendered tankage". The cracklings are further ground to make meat and bone meal.

A variation on a dry process involves finely chopping the material, fluidizing it with hot fat, and then evaporating the mixture in one or more evaporator stages. Some inedible rendering is done using a wet process, which is generally a continuous process similar in some ways to that used for edible materials. The material is heated with added steam and then pressed to remove a water-fat mixture that is then separated into fat, water, and fine solids by stages of centrifuging and/or evaporation. The solids from the press are dried and then ground into meat and bone meal. Most independent renderers process only inedible material.

=== Kitchen scale ===
Rendering of fats is also carried out on a kitchen scale by chefs and home cooks. In the kitchen, rendering is used to transform butter into clarified butter, suet into tallow, pork fat into lard, and chicken fat into schmaltz.

== History ==
The development of rendering was primarily responsible for the profitable utilization of meat industry by-products, which in turn allowed the development of a massive industrial-scale meat industry that made food more economical for the consumer.

Rendering has been carried out for many centuries, primarily for soap and candle making. The earliest rendering was done in a kettle over an open fire. This type of rendering is still done on farms to make lard (pork fat) for food purposes. With the development of steam boilers, it was possible to use steam-jacketed kettles to make a higher grade product, and reduce fire danger. From at least 1896, yellow grease has referred to lower-quality grades of tallow (cow or sheep fat) from animal rendering plants.

A further development came in the 19th century with the use of steam digesters: a tank used as a pressure cooker where steam was injected into the material being rendered. This process is a wet rendering process called "tanking" and was used for edible and inedible products, although better grades of edible products were made using the open kettle process. After the material is tanked, the free fat is run off, the remaining water ("tank water") run into a separate vat, and the solids removed and dried by pressing and steam-drying in a jacketed vessel. The tank water was either run into a sewer or it was evaporated to make glue or protein concentrate to add to fertilizer. The solids were used for fertilizer.

The pressure tank made possible the development of the Chicago meat industry in the United States—with its concentration in one geographic area—because it allowed the economic disposal of byproducts which would otherwise overwhelm the environment in that area. At first, small companies that sprang up near the packers did the rendering. Later the packers entered the rendering industry. Gustavus Swift, Nelson Morris, and Lucius Darling were among the early pioneers of the U.S. rendering industry, with their personal backing and/or direct participation in the rendering industry.

Upton Sinclair wrote The Jungle (1906), an exposé on the Chicago meat processing industry which created public outrage. His work helped the passage of the Pure Food and Drug Act of 1906 which paved the way for the creation of the FDA.

Innovations came rapidly in the 20th century. Some of these were the uses for rendered products, and others were the rendering methods. In the 1920s, a batch dry rendering process was invented; the material was cooked in horizontal steam-jacketed cylinders (similar to the fertilizer dryers of the day). Advantages claimed for the dry process were economy of energy, better protein yield, faster processing, and fewer noxious odors. Over the years, the wet "tanking" process was replaced with the dry process. By the end of World War II, most rendering installations used the dry process. In the 1960s, continuous dry processes were introduced, one using a variation of the conventional dry cooker and the other making use of a mincing and evaporation process to dry the material and yield the fat. In the 1980s, high energy costs popularized the various "wet" continuous processes. These processes were more energy efficient and allowed the re-use of process vapours to pre-heat or dry the materials during the process.

After World War II, synthetic detergents arrived, which displaced soaps in domestic and industrial washing. In the early 1950s, over half of the inedible fat market vanished. Diversion of these materials into animal feeds soon replaced the lost soap market and eventually became the single largest use for inedible fats.

The widespread use of "boxed beef", where the beef was cut into consumer portions at packing plants rather than local butcher shops and markets, meant that fat and meat scraps for renderers stayed at the packing plants and were rendered there by packer renderers, rather than by the independent rendering companies.

The rejection of animal fats by diet-conscious consumers led to a surplus of edible fats, and the resultant diversion into soapmaking and oleochemicals, displacing inedible fats and contributing to the market volatility of this commodity. In 2012, the occupation of renderer appeared in a list of "dirtiest jobs".

== Advantages and disadvantages ==
The rendering industry is one of the oldest recycling industries, and made possible the development of a large food industry. The industry takes what would otherwise be waste materials and makes useful products such as skin cream, cosmetics, fuels, soaps, rubber, plastics, etc. At the same time, rendering reduces what would otherwise be a major disposal problem. As an example, the United States annually recycles more than 21 million metric tons of highly perishable and noxious organic matter. In 2004, U.S. industry produced over 8 million metric tons of products, of which 1.6 million metric tons were exported.

Usually, raw materials are susceptible to spoilage. After rendering, they are much more resistant. This is due to the application of heat either through cooking in the wet rendering process or the extraction of fluid in the dry rendering process. The fat obtained can be used as low-cost raw material in making grease, animal feed, soap, candles, biodiesel, and as a feed-stock for the chemical industry. Tallow, derived from beef waste, is an important raw material in the steel rolling industry, providing lubrication when compressing steel sheets.

Meat and bone meal in animal feed was one route for the late-20th century spread of bovine spongiform encephalopathy (mad-cow disease, BSE), which is also fatal to humans. Early in the 21st century, most countries tightened regulations to prevent this.

== See also ==
- Animal slaughter
- Animal euthanasia
- Boiling down (Australian term for rendering)
- Dead Horse Bay
- Flensing
- Whale oil
