= Lamakera =

Village in Solor Island, Indonesia

Coordinates: 8°26′S 123°10′E

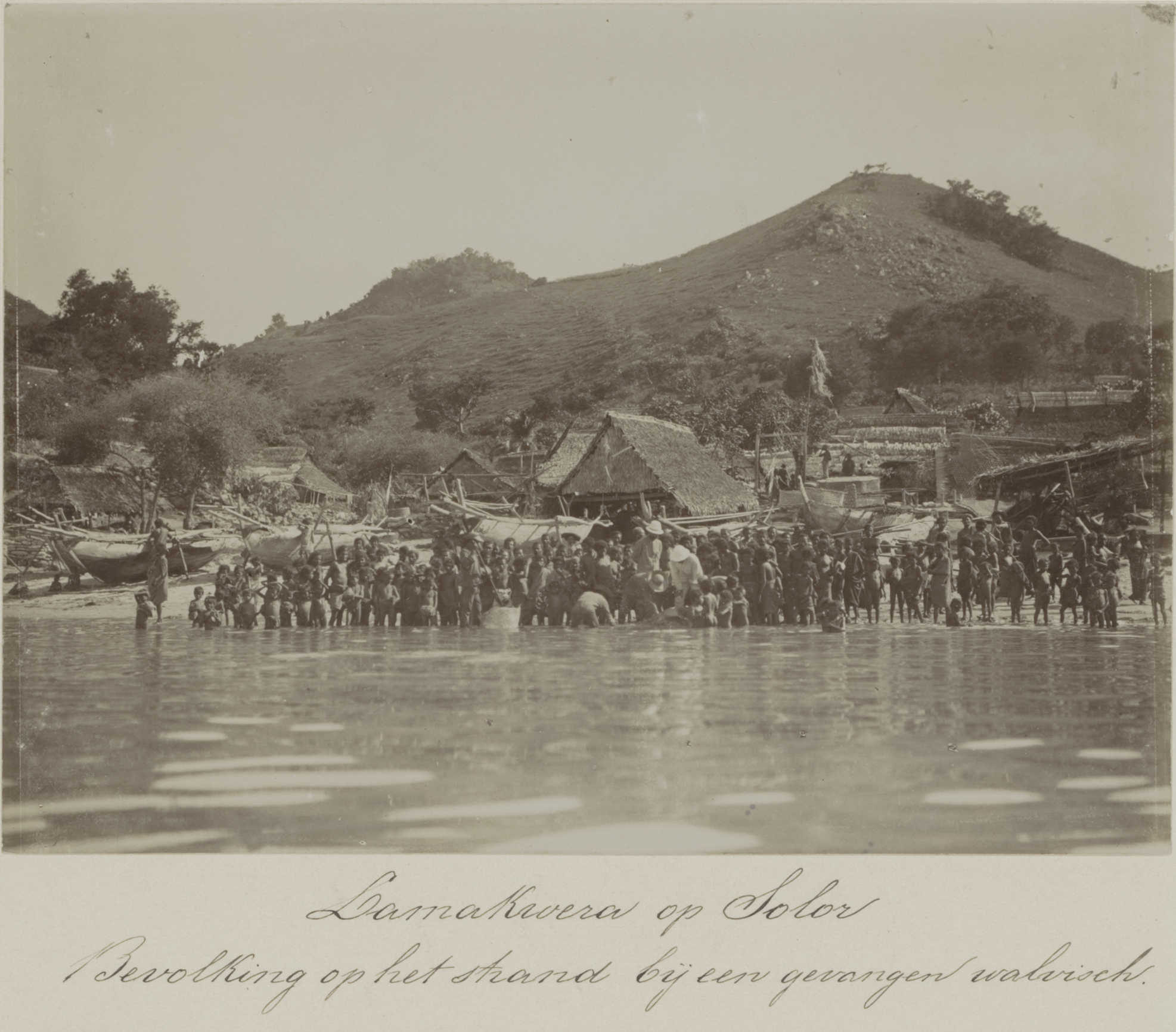
Lamakera in 1904

Lamakera is a village in Indonesia, on the east tip of Solor Island. It was known for being the place where the most manta rays are killed. It was featured in the 2015 documentary film Racing Extinction. The villagers also hunted whales.

== History ==
In 1520, the Portuguese established a trading post at Lamakera as a transit harbor between Maluku and Portuguese Malacca.

== Economy ==
The village used to rely on marine resources because it had no farm. Lamakera was situated in a manta ray hotspot, and so was responsible for one-third of the global catch. They had been known to hunt many kinds of whales and porpoises (temu) in a period between March and August; they also used to hunt baleen whales (kelaru) but had since ceased out of a traditional prohibition. Blue whales (lélangaji, "great ancestor") are prohibited as they are deemed sacred. Each whaler is equipped with different types of harpoons (kāfé) made for particular sea game – the smallest around 20–30 cm are made to kill sharks, turtles and rays while the largest at 48 cm are for sperm whales (kotekĕlema).

Across the strait is the island of Lembata, where the village of Lamalera also hunts from the deep sea trenches of the Savu Sea, particularly known for its hunting of the sperm whale from small open boats. This is allowed under International Whaling Commission regulations around aboriginal whaling but conservationists worry that commercial whaling is also done. Lamalera and Lamakera are the last two remaining Indonesian whaling communities.

In 2016, the Manta Trust, Misool Foundation and ReefCheck Indonesia developed the Lamakera Project with the purpose to find sustainable alternatives to the traditional manta ray hunting.

=== Tourism ===
As part of the documentary film Racing Extinction, the cast members convinced the village to start the tourism industry. Despite the film's release in 2015, CITES has listed all manta ray species in 2013.

Indonesia has made it illegal to harm a manta ray. The village has turned all of its fishing boats into whale watching boats.

Tourism made overcrowded the sites of manta rays, increasing significantly the likelihood of boat accidents. By way of this, the local community started to plan the touristic flows in a way more sustainable for the local environment.

== Demographics ==
Most of the island, especially the east, is, like the rest of Indonesia, predominantly Muslim.
