= Flensing =

Process of harvesting blubber from whales

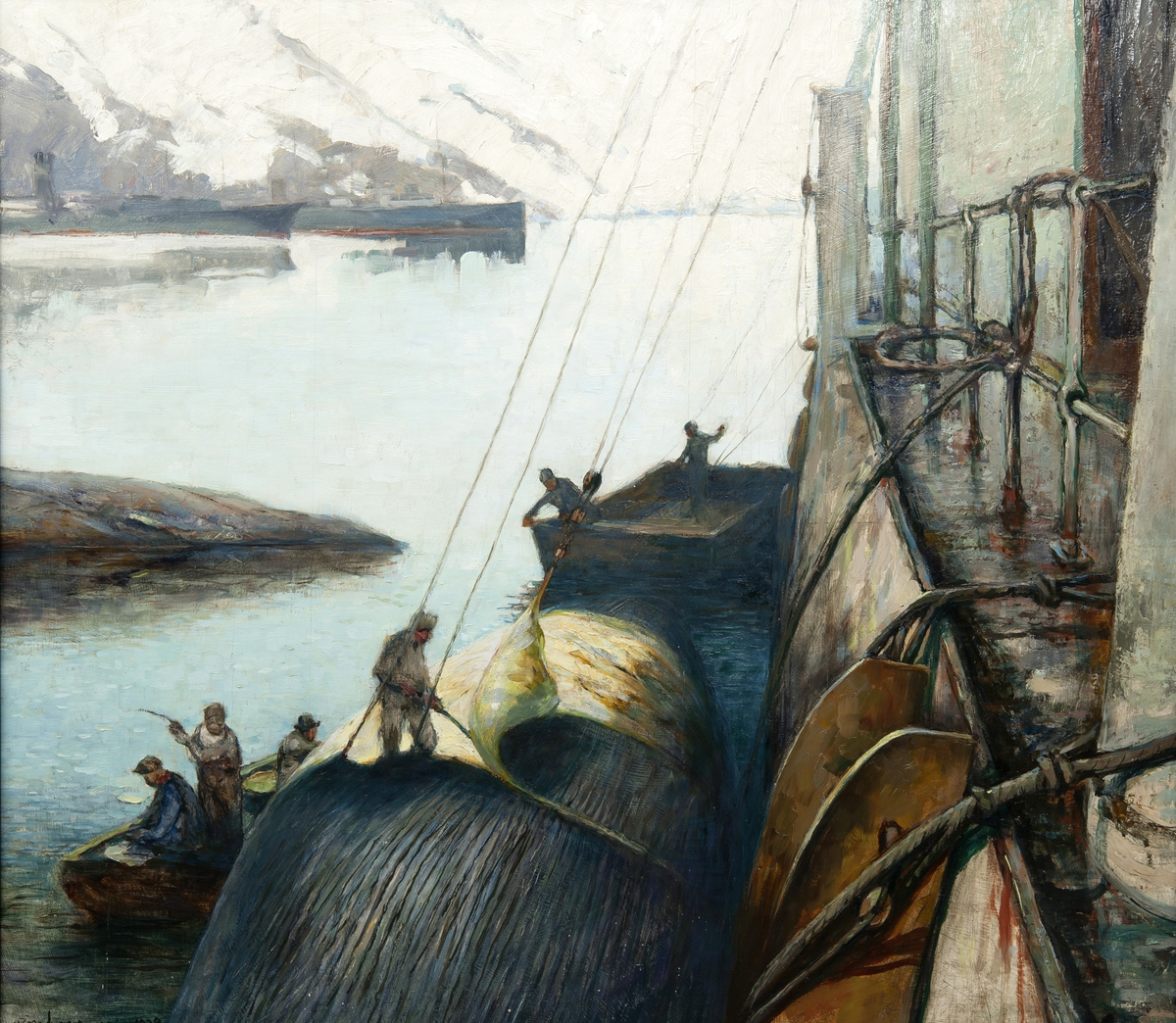
Flensing at Whalers Bay, Deception Island

Flensing is the removing of the blubber or outer integument of whales, separating it from the animal's meat. Processing the blubber (the subcutaneous fat) into whale oil was the key step that transformed a whale carcass into a stable, transportable commodity. It was an important part of the history of whaling. The whaling that still continues in the 21st century is both industrial and aboriginal. In aboriginal whaling the blubber is rarely rendered into oil, although it is regularly eaten as muktuk.

== Terminology ==
English whalemen referred to the process as flensing, while American whalemen called it cutting-in or flinching.

== Open-boat ==
=== Shore and bay whaling ===
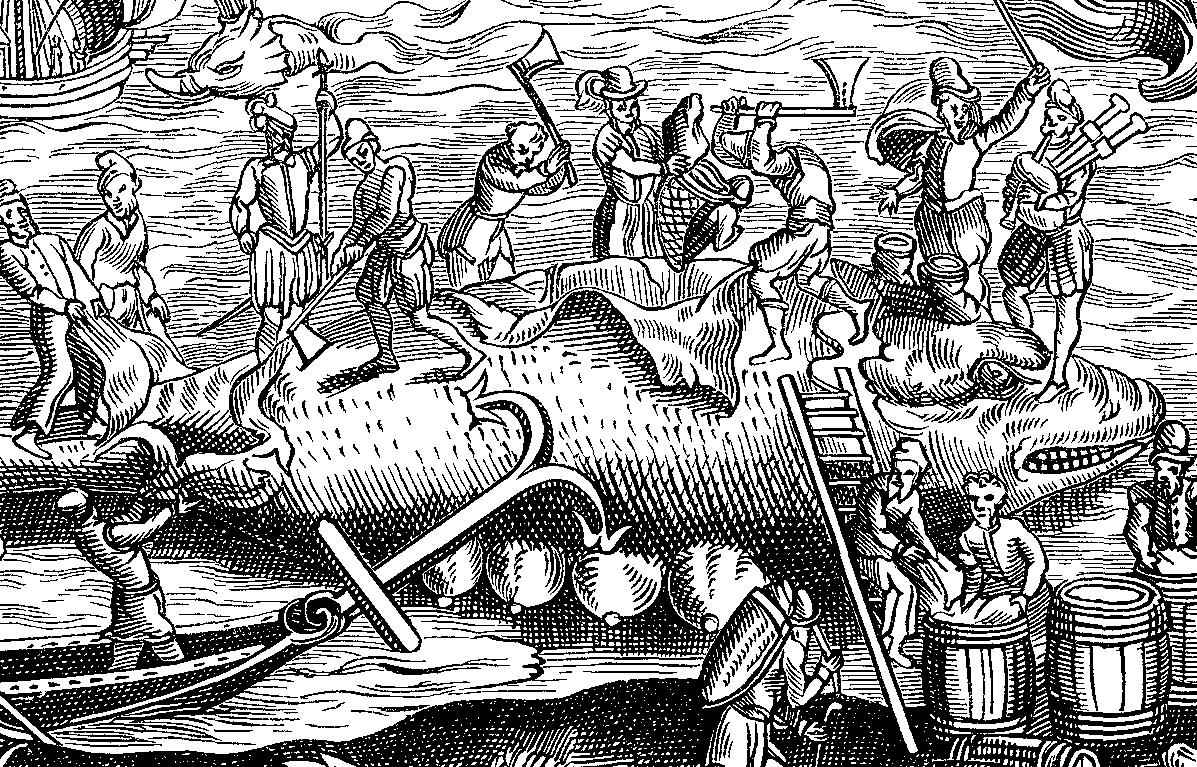
Whale-Fishing. Facsimile of a Woodcut in the "Cosmographie Universelle" of Thevet, in folio: Paris, 1574

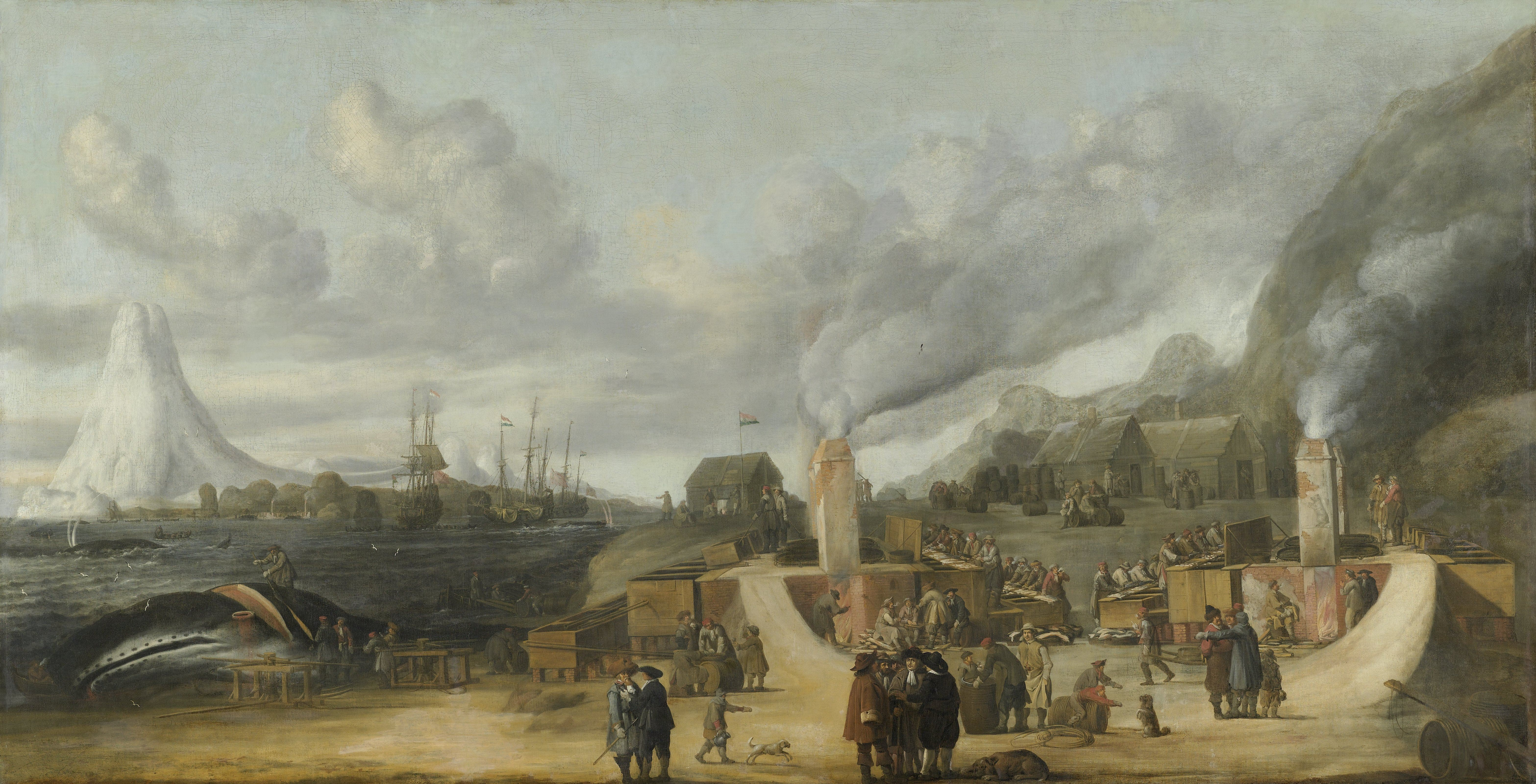
"Smeerenburg". A whale (left foreground) is being flensed. Painting by Cornelis de Man (1639).

In Spitsbergen, in the first half of the 17th century, the processing of whales was primarily done ashore. Where the whale was flensed differed between the English and Dutch. The English brought the whale to the stern of the ship, where men in a boat cut strips of blubber from the whale's back. These were tied together and rowed ashore, where they were cut into smaller pieces to be boiled into oil in large copper kettles (trypots). The Dutch eschewed this system, bringing the whales into the shallows at high-tide and flensing them at low-tide. This latter method proved much less time-consuming and more effective. Both parties only cut off the blubber and the head, leaving the rest of the carcass to polar bears and sea birds.

In Japan the whole carcass was utilized. During the open-boat whaling era in Japan in the late 16th to early 20th century, whales were winched ashore by large capstans. There, men with flensing knives would not only cut up the blubber into long strips with the assistance of these capstans, but also cut up the viscera and bones to make various products.

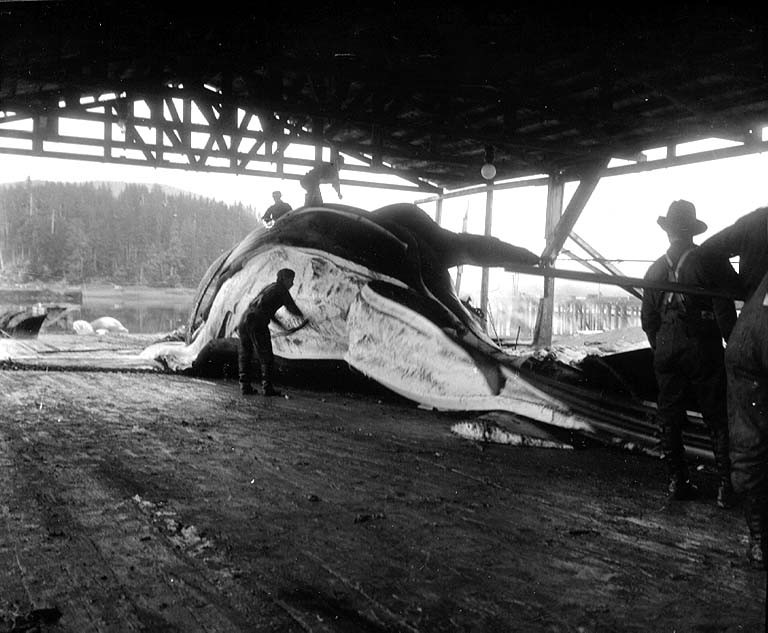
Flensing at the Tyee Company whaling station at Murder Cove, Alaska

Shore whaling flensing methods elsewhere differed little from the European whaling mentioned above. In California during the 19th century whales could be winched ashore either at a sandy beach or, in the case of the Carmel Bay station just south of Monterey, they were brought to the side of a stone-laid quay to be flensed. Cutting-tackles were suspended from an elevated beam, allowing the whalers to roll the carcass over in the water for flensing. On Norfolk Island humpback whales were flensed in the shallows along a rocky beach. Men sliced the blubber from the lean with the assistance of a winch.

=== Pelagic whaling ===
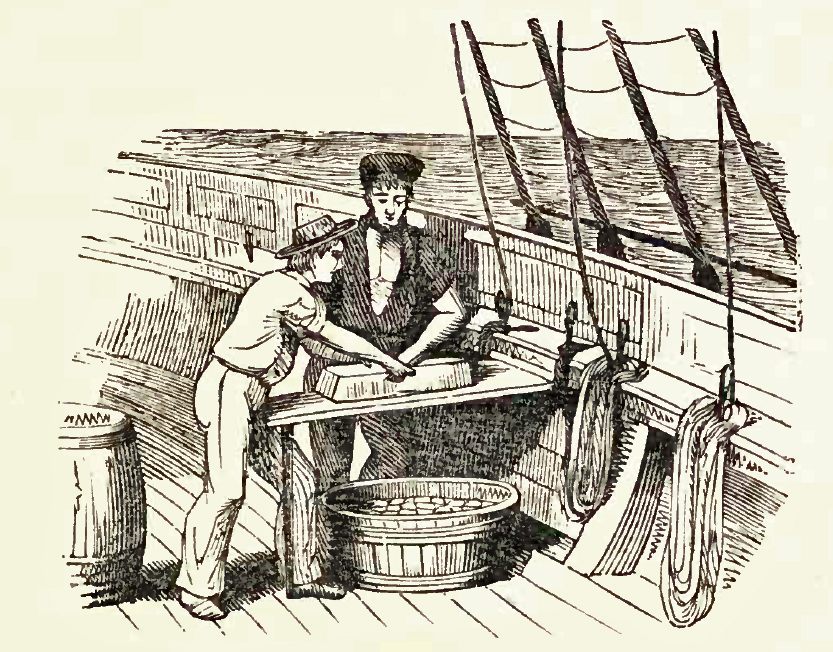
Mincing blubber

By the 1630s whaling had spread offshore and into the ice floes west of Spitsbergen. Here whales were flensed alongside the ship, the blubber cut into small pieces and put into casks to either be boiled into oil at a station ashore, or, by late century, on the return to port. At about the same time Basque whalers began trying-out oil aboard ship, but this appears to have met limited success: the method was not fully utilized until the late 18th century.

American whaleships also adopted this method. The whale, whether it be a baleen or toothed whale, was usually brought to the starboard side of the ship tail-first. A cutting-stage was lowered over the carcass consisting of three heavy planks where men with long-handled cutting spades could stand to "cut in" the whale. The blubber was cut in strips called "blanket pieces" in a circular fashion (like peeling an orange). For a baleen whale the sides of the lower lips were cut off and its upper jaw, filled with valuable baleen, was hacked off with an axe. For a sperm whale the tooth-studded lower jaw was wrenched off, and head taken off and brought aboard; if it was a particularly large specimen, it was brought aboard in two segments. Besides the blubber and baleen, whalemen would also take the tongue of a baleen whale, as well as the flukes of both baleen and toothed whales before setting the carcass adrift for sharks and other scavengers. The blanket pieces were hoisted down into the blubber room, where men cut the pieces into smaller "horse pieces" about four feet by six inches (120 by 15 cm). These in turn were made into "bible leaves", which were put into the two (or three) try-pots to be boiled into oil. The baleen, meanwhile, was pulled from the gum, washed with sand and water, polished, and put into bundles.

== Modern ==
=== Shore and bay whaling ===
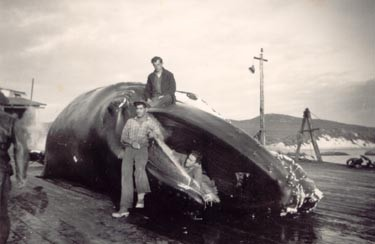
A humpback whale about to be flensed at the Cheynes Beach Whaling Station in the early 1950s

Flensing at stations in the early modern era (late nineteenth century) differed little from earlier methods. In Finnmark the whales were merely flensed at low-tide. Later mechanical winches and slipways were introduced. The whale was winched up the slipway onto a flensing plan, where men with long-handled knives shaped like hockey sticks would cut off long strips of blubber with the help of winches. As more and more of the carcass was utilized flensing became more specialized. Soon the entire whale was being used.

At Grytviken, a whaling station at South Georgia, after the blubber had been stripped off the carcass by a group of flensers, a gang of three lemmers would pull it aside with the aid of steam winches and blocks to remove the meat and bone. Other men armed with steel hooks cut the meat into smaller pieces and fed them into meat cookers, while the bones were put into separate boilers.

=== Pelagic ===
At first, factory ships, simply more modern versions of earlier American whaleships, could only anchor in a bay to process whales. They used virtually the same techniques as open-boat whalemen, bringing the carcass alongside the ship, cutting the blubber into long strips, which were cut into smaller pieces to be boiled in large steam cookers. In the southern summer of 1912-13 the first successful attempt was made by a Norwegian factory ship at catching and flensing whales in the pack ice off South Orkney. A further breakthrough occurred in the 1923–24 season when the Norwegian factory ship Sir James Clark Ross spent an entire season in the Ross Sea flensing whales alongside the ship while anchored in Discovery Inlet off the Ross Ice Shelf. With the introduction of the stern slipway in the Lancing in 1925 flensing could be performed entirely on the open sea.

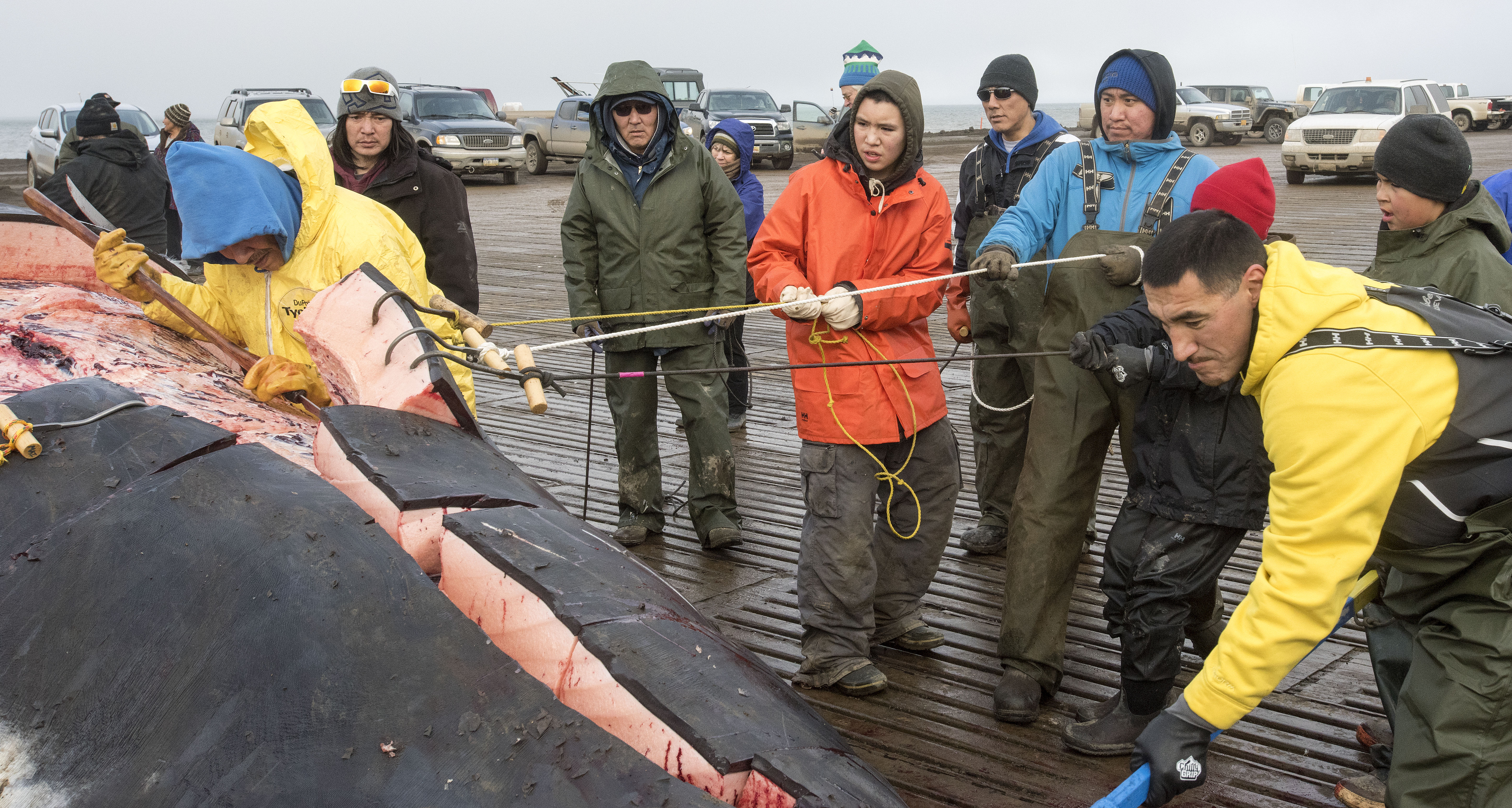
A group of Inupiaq flense a bowhead whale on the north side of Barrow, Alaska Oct. 5, 2017.

The carcass was brought to the stern of the factory ship, where several other carcasses could be waiting to be processed. A line was looped around the small of its tail and it was brought to the bottom of the slipway, where the small of its flukes was secured by a whale claw (a giant pair of tongs invented by the Norwegian Anton Gjelstad in 1931) and pulled up unto the deck of the ship by powerful steam winches. On each side of the whale there were large chocks built into the deck so the carcass wouldn't roll in a rough sea. Two flensers, one on each side, cut longitudinal slits along the length of the body, while another man with spiked boots climbed atop the whale to make further cuts. With the use of a winch on an arch at the center of the ship two strips of blubber were pulled off (like the peeling of a banana), which was attended by "a crackling like a bonfire of peasticks."

Next the lower jaw, which can be as long as twenty feet (6 m) for a blue whale, was lifted skyward, wrenched off and the baleen cut out. The carcass was rolled over and a third strip of blubber was pulled off. The blubber was further cut into smaller pieces and fed into manholes in the deck which lead to the cookers. The carcass was brought forward where the lemmers, just like their Grytviken counterparts, took care of the meat, bone, and viscera. This allowed another whale to be brought up the slipway and onto the deck to be flensed. The meat was flensed similar to the blubber, while the bones were sliced by a steam-driven bone saw. The carcass was once again turned over, allowing more of the meat and ribs to be taken off. The good-quality meat was frozen, while virtually everything else was dropped down through the manholes into the cookers.
