= Lamalera =

Lamalera may refer to:

- Lamalera people, an ethnic group of Lembata Island, Indonesia
- Lamalera language, a language spoken by the Lamalera people
