= Aboriginal whaling =

Hunting of whales by indigenous people

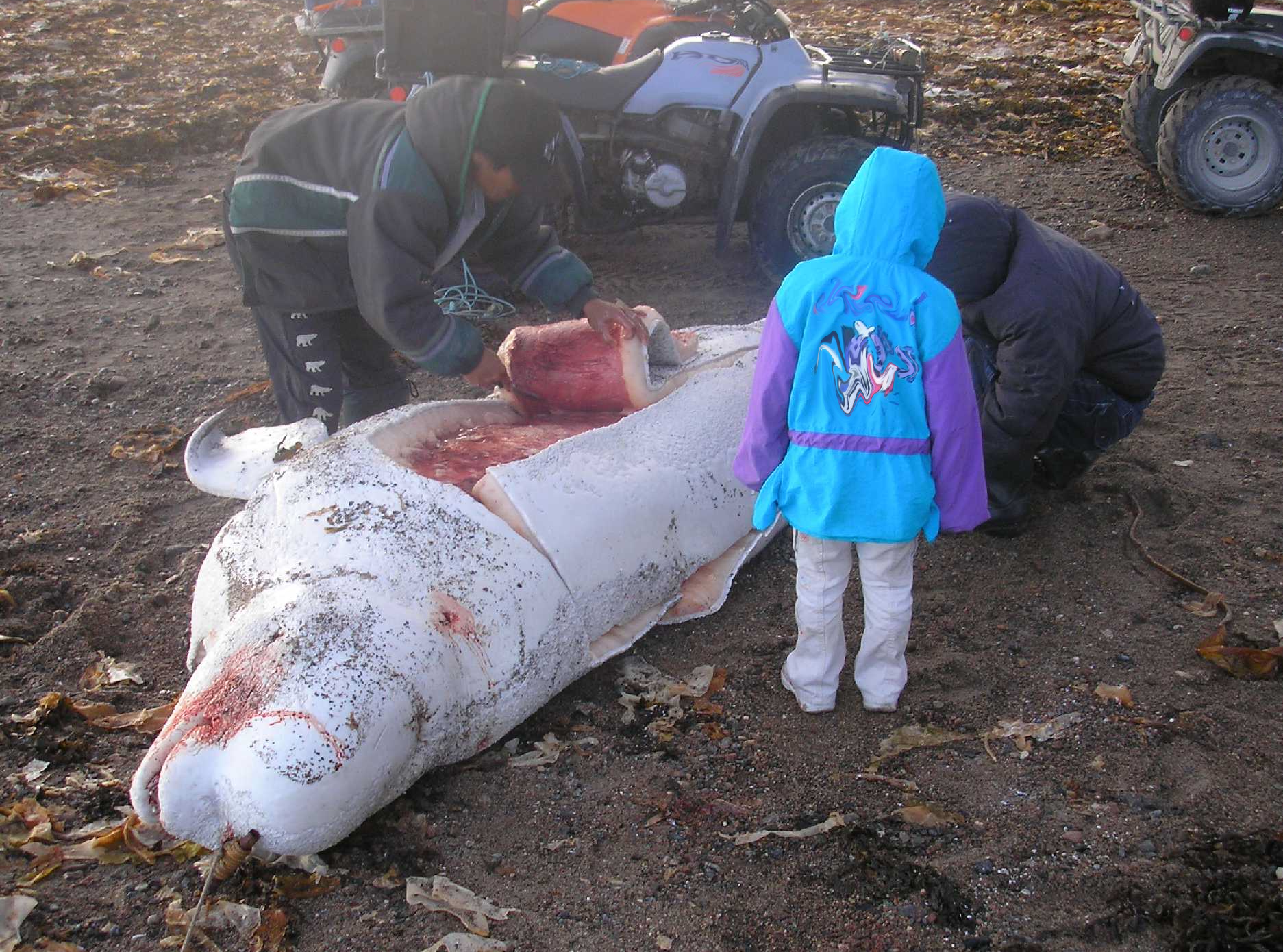
Inuit subsistence whaling, 2007. A beluga whale is flensed for its maktaaq (skin), an important source of vitamin C in the Arctic.

Aboriginal whaling or indigenous whaling is the hunting of whales by indigenous peoples recognised by either IWC (International Whaling Commission) or the hunting is considered as part of indigenous activity by the country. It is permitted under international regulation, but in some countries remains a contentious issue. (The hunting of smaller cetaceans is covered at Dolphin drive hunting.) It is usually considered part of the subsistence economy. In some places, whaling has been superseded by whale watching instead. This article deals with communities that continue to hunt; details about communities that have ended the practice may be found in History of whaling.

== International regulation ==
Under the terms of the 1986 moratorium, the International Whaling Commission allows the activity to be carried out by aboriginal groups if it occurs on a subsistence basis, similar to subsistence fishing. This Aboriginal Subsistence Whaling is restricted to native peoples and others working on their behalf, as defined by the IWC.

The IWC says that:

Since its inception, the IWC has recognised that indigenous or 'aboriginal subsistence' whaling is of a different nature to commercial whaling. It is thus not subject to the moratorium. This is reflected in the different objectives for the two types of whaling. For aboriginal subsistence whaling the objectives are to:

- ensure that risks of extinction are not seriously increased by whaling;
- enable native people recognised as "Aborigines" to hunt whales at level appropriate to satisfy their cultural, subsistence and nutritional requirements (also called 'need'); and
- move populations towards and then maintain them at healthy levels.

In order for a country to carry out a hunt under the aboriginal group clause, the nation must provide the IWC with evidence of "the cultural and subsistence needs of their people." In particular, the hunt is not intended for commercial purposes and the caught meat cannot be exported.

In 2018, the Commission endorsed proposals made by a working group established six-years earlier to consider some long-standing and complex questions, and improve the way that the Commission considered ASW. A number of new initiatives were endorsed in order to facilitate a more straightforward process when catch limits are next considered at the 2024 meeting of the Commission. The new initiatives include:

- a new timetable for sharing information from the hunts, and receiving feedback, maximising discussion time and transparency
- agreement that status quo catch limits would be renewed automatically, assuming a series of agreed steps continue to be completed
- a commitment to establish closer ties with international and inter-governmental organisations focusing on indigenous rights

== United States whaling ==
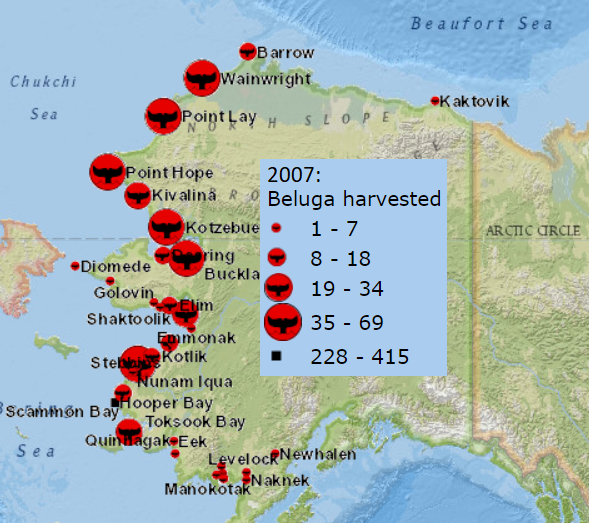
Alaska beluga harvest in 2007

In the United States whaling is carried out by Alaska Natives and by the Makah of Washington State. It no longer occurs on the Atlantic coast, although the Pilgrim Fathers found the original inhabitants of New England had a well-developed understanding of drift whales.

=== Alaska ===
The Arctic whaling program is managed by the Alaska Eskimo Whaling Commission, which reports to the National Oceanic and Atmospheric Administration. The commission includes eleven whaling communities which inhabit the Arctic Alaska coast: the Gambell, Savoonga, Wales, Little Diomede, Kivalina, Point Hope, Point Lay, Wainwright, Barrow, Nuiqsut, and Kaktovik.

In 2015 Alaska Natives caught 326 beluga whales and 49 bowhead whales. In 2016 they caught 59 bowhead whales, two minke and one humpback whale; The latter two species were not authorized, though no one was prosecuted. Annual catches vary between 300 and 500 belugas and 40 to 70 bowheads.

The hunt takes the bowhead whales from a population of about 10,000 in Alaskan waters. Anti-whaling groups claim this hunt is not sustainable, though the IWC Scientific Committee, the same group that provided the above population estimate, projects a population growth of 3.2% per year. The hunt also took an average of one or two gray whales each year until 1996. The quota was reduced to zero in that year due to concerns about sustainability.

=== Washington State ===
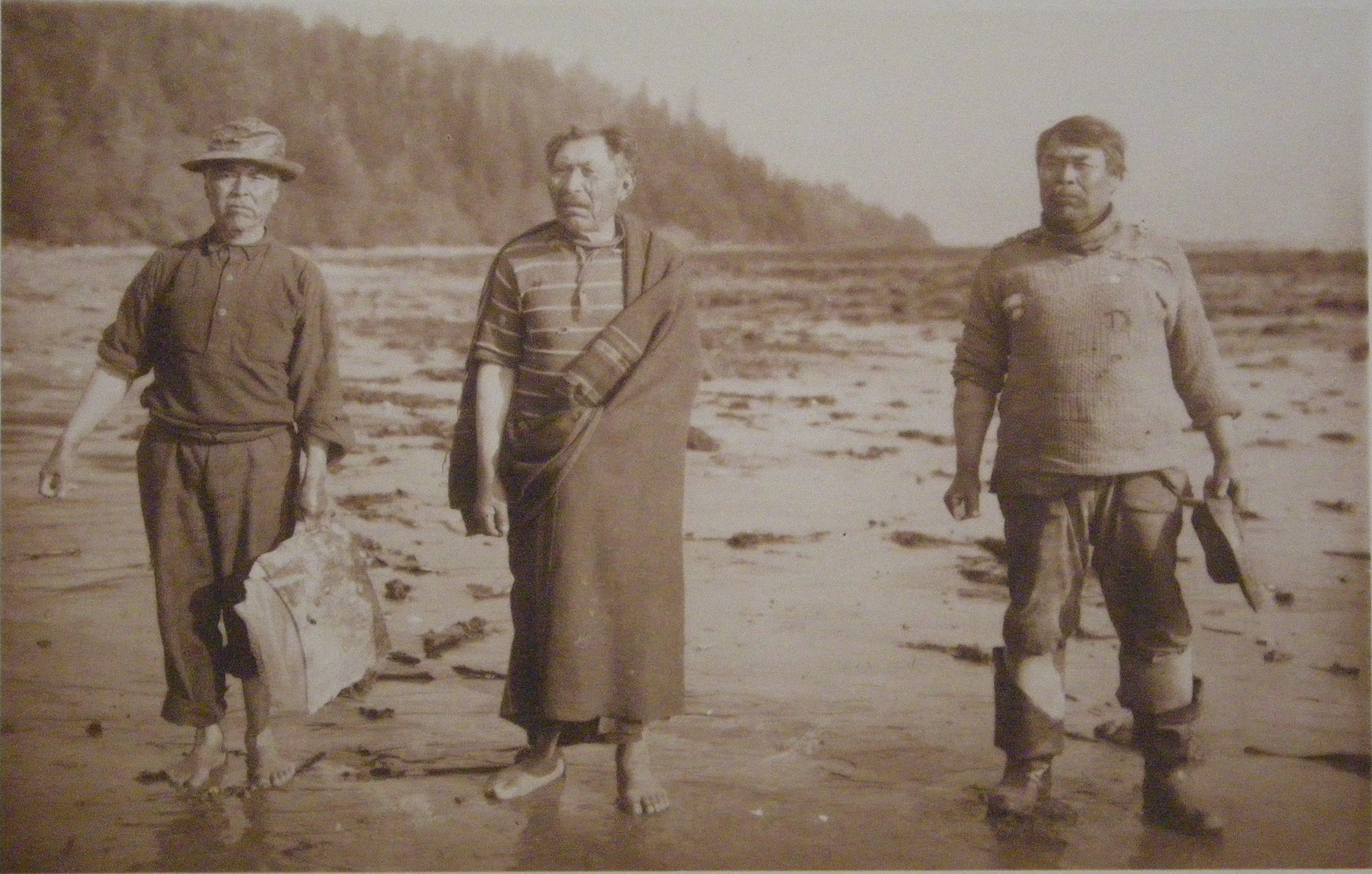
Members from the Makah tribe getting ready to harvest a whale, 1910

According to federal law, the Makah people of Washington State are entitled to hunt and kill one baleen whale, typically a gray whale, each year, though archeological records and oral history indicate a significant number of humpback whales were hunted as well. The Makah ended their whaling practices in the 1920s, but notified the U.S. Government of their wish to reassert their whaling rights in 1995. The first permitted Makah whale hunt in 70 years occurred on 17 May 1999, when they caught a north Pacific gray whale, an unpermitted hunt killed another in 2007, and in 2018 they took meat from a humpback killed by a ship strike. An environmental impact statement for further hunts was issued in 2015.

On 5 April 2019 NOAA Fisheries proposed issuing a waiver under the MMPA to the Makah tribe to allow hunting, as well as a what stakeholders can do to engage in the public rule making process before an Administrative Law Judge. One of the main stipulations that NOAA proposed was allowing the Makah people to hunt as many as 20 gray whales every five years, however prior to any hunt the tribe would have to obtain a permit from NOAA. On 2 August 2019 the Administrative Law Judge announced that the final agenda for the hearing on NOAA's proposed waiver and regulations was set for November 2019, which was postponed from the previous 26 June 2019 announcement.

== Canadian whaling ==
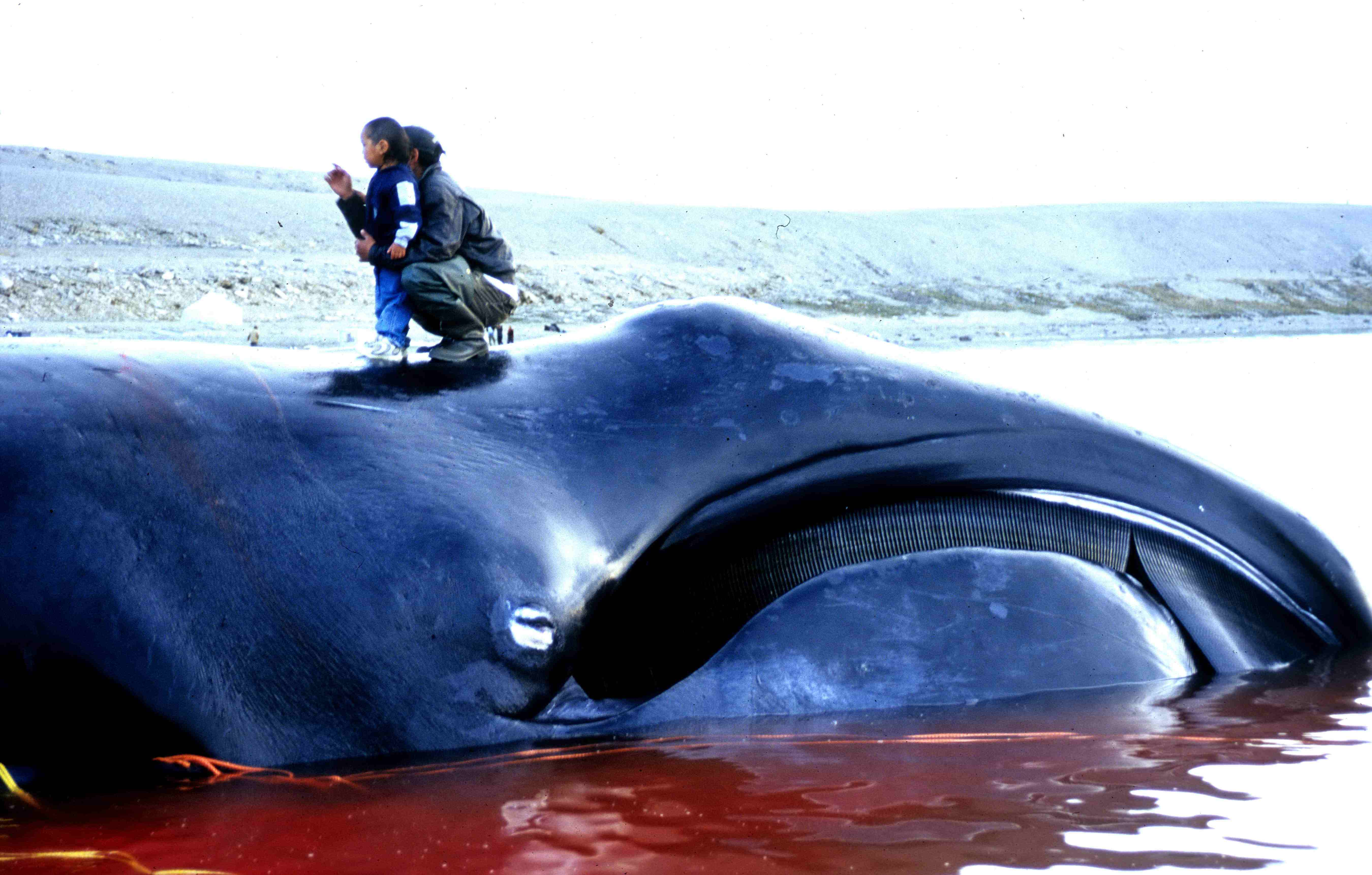
Bowhead whale caught in Igloolik, Nunavut in 2002

Canada left the IWC in 1982 and as such is not bound by the moratorium. Whaling is carried out by various Inuit groups in the Canadian Arctic in small numbers and is managed by the Department of Fisheries and Oceans.

== Russian whaling ==
Chukchi people of the Chukotka Autonomous Okrug in the Russian Far East are permitted to take up to 140 gray whales from the North-East Pacific population and 67 Bering-Chukchi-Beaufort bowhead whales in the period 2026 - 2031.

== Caribbean whaling ==
Some whaling is conducted from Grenada, Dominica, Saint Vincent and the Grenadines and Saint Lucia. Species hunted are the short-finned pilot whale, killer whale, pygmy killer whale and spinner dolphins. Throughout the Caribbean, around 400 pilot whales are killed annually with the meat being sold locally. This hunting of small cetaceans is not regulated by the IWC.

Whales are hunted in Bequia, the largest of the Grenadines. Natives of Bequia are allowed to catch up to four humpback whales per year using only traditional hunting methods of hand-thrown harpoons in small, open sailboats. The limit is rarely met, with no catch some years. Its classification as aboriginal, and therefore permissible, is highly contested. In the 2012 meeting of the IWC, delegates from several anti-whaling countries, and environmental groups, spoke out against it, with Peter Sanchez of the Dominican Republic calling it "artisanal whaling out of control".

== Faroese whaling ==
Whalers in the Faroe Islands take approximately 800 long-finned pilot whales per year. These hunts are called grindadráp in Faroese.

== Indonesian whaling ==
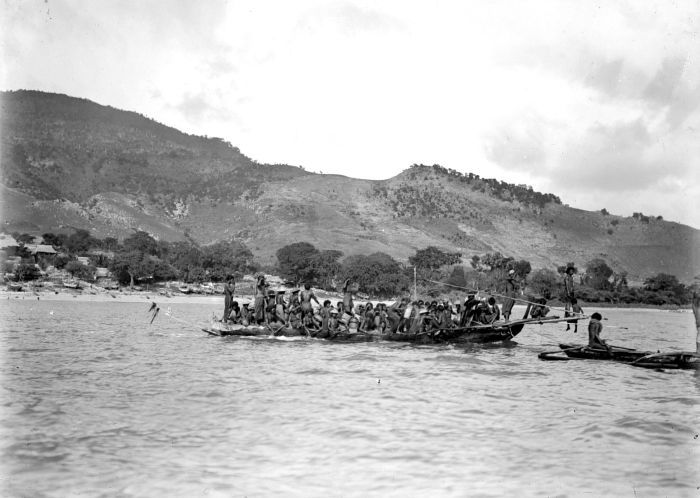
Lamakera whale hunters in a traditional boat called paledang. 1900.

Lamalera, on the south coast of the island of Lembata, and Lamakera on neighbouring Solor are the last two remaining Indonesian whaling communities. The hunters have religious taboos that ensure that they use every part of the animal. About half of the catch is kept in the village; the rest is traded in local markets, using barter. The whale hunts are carried out in a traditional manner, with bamboo spears and small wooden outriggers, 10–12 m long and 2m wide, constructed without nails and with sails woven from palm fronds. The animals are killed by the harpooner leaping onto the back of the animal, from the boat, to drive in the harpoon.

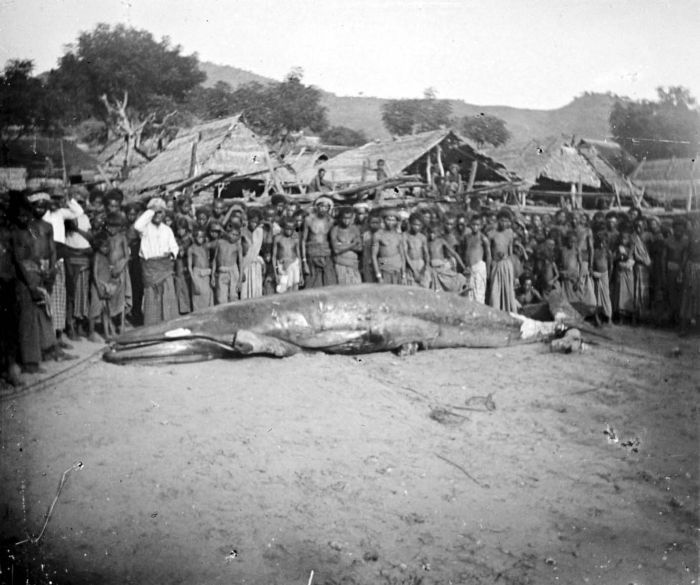
A dead whale on the beach at Lamakera, surrounded by villagers. 1900.

The people of Lamalera hunt several species of whales, primarily sperm whales (the baleen whale is taboo), and in the peak year of 1969 caught 56 sperm whales. In addition to whales, dolphins, manta rays, turtles and several species of sharks are also hunted. In 1973, the United Nations Food and Agriculture Organization sent a whaling ship and a Norwegian master whaler, to modernize the hunt. This effort lasted three years, and was not successful. According to the FAO report, the Lamalerans "have evolved a method of whaling which suits their natural resources, cultural tenets and style."

The World Wildlife Fund has carried out surveys in the village to determine that the limited hunting does not endanger world whale stocks or other endangered species.
