= Nantucket (disambiguation) =

Nantucket is an island, town and county in Massachusetts.

Nantucket may also refer to:

== Places ==
- Nantucket (CDP), Massachusetts, the main village on the island and in the town
- Nantucket Sound, a section of water along the coast of Massachusetts
- New Nantucket, the former name for Baker Island in the Pacific Ocean

== Ships ==
- List of ships named Nantucket, including:
  - USS Nantucket, several US Navy ships
  - Steamship Authority, several ferries named Nantucket
  - Lightship Nantucket, several lightships stationes off the island
- Nantucket Sleighride, the event when a boat from a whaling whip is towed at high speed by a harpooned whale

== Music ==
- Nantucket (band), a hard rock band from North Carolina
  - Nantucket (album), an album by hard rock band Nantucket
  - Nantucket V, an album by hard rock band Nantucket
  - The Best Of Nantucket, a compilation album by hard rock band Nantucket
- Nantucket Sleighride (album), an album and its title song by the hard rock band Mountain

== Other uses ==
- Nantucket series, a set of alternate history books written by S. M. Stirling.
- Nantucket Nectars, a beverage company
- Nantucket Corporation, the company that developed the programming language Clipper
- "There once was a man from Nantucket", the opening line for many limericks
