= The Best of Nantucket =

The Best Of Nantucket

Greatest hits album by Nantucket
- Released: 1986
- Recorded: 1977–1985
- Genre: Hard rock
- Length: 37:41

Nantucket chronology
Nantucket V (1985)	The Best Of Nantucket (1986)	Still Live after All These Years (1995)

The Best Of Nantucket is a compilation of popular songs from North Carolina music group, Nantucket. It covers material from all studio albums by the band from 1978 through 1985.

== Track listing ==
1. Heartbreaker – 3:53 (from Nantucket, 1978)
2. Never Gonna Take Your Lies – 3:49 (from Nantucket, 1978)
3. Real Romance – 4:08 (from Nantucket, 1978)
4. Born in a Honky Tonk – 3:21 (from Nantucket, 1978)
5. Quite Like You - 2:29 (from Nantucket, 1978)
6. Is It Wrong to Rock and Roll - 5:18 (from Your Face or Mine?, 1979)
7. Pretty Legs - 3:34 (from Nantucket V, 1985)
8. Time Bomb - 2:59 (from Long Way to the Top, 1980)
9. California - 4:11 (from Your Face or Mine?, 1979)
10. Looking You Up - 3:59 (from Nantucket V, 1985)

== Personnel ==
- Tommy Redd: Lead & Rhythm Guitars, Acoustic Guitar, Spoon, Lead & Background Vocals
- Larry Uzzell: Lead & Background Vocals, Bass Guitar, Trumpet, Harp, Congas, Percussion, Harmonica
- Mike Uzzell: Moog Bass, Various Keyboards & Synthesizers, B-3 Organ, Piano, Lead & Background Vocals
- Eddie Blair: Tenor & Soprano Saxophones, Keyboards, Piano, Organ, Clavinet, Percussion, Background Vocals
- Kenny Soule: Drums & Percussion, Tympani, Background Vocals
- Mark Downing: Lead, Slide, Rhythm & Acoustic Guitars, 12-String Guitar, Pedal Guitar
- Pee Wee Watson: Bass Guitar, Background Vocals
- Richard Gates: Drums, Oberheim DX Drum Machine
- David "Thumbs" Johnson: Bass Guitar, Oberheim DX Drum Machine, Background Vocals
- Alan Thornton: Lead & Rhytham Guitars, Z-28
