= Explosive harpoon =

Type of harpoon used in whaling

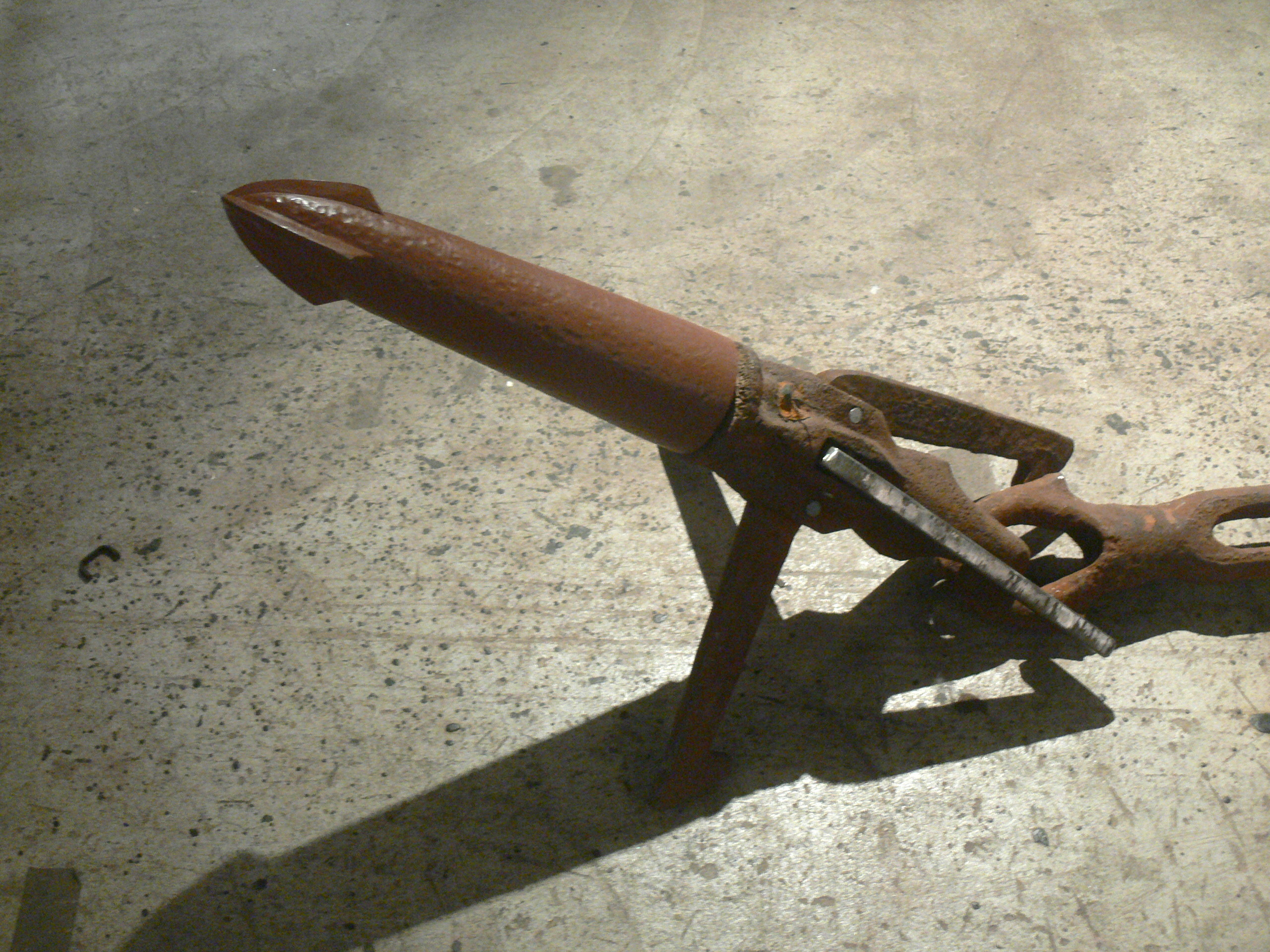
Explosive harpoon used in Iceland in the 20th century

The explosive harpoon is a type of harpoon which uses an explosive to assist in whaling. In the modern day, Norway, Japan, and Iceland commonly use them.

== History ==
Albert Moore is credited for inventing the first explosive harpoon, patenting his invention on March 16, 1844 (U.S. Patent No. 3,490). The harpoon was a simple hand-dart design that contained a small vial of explosive that would ignite when the tip of the harpoon was rotated. In the 1850s a similar device was popularized, called the bomb lance. The lance was fired out of a small whaling gun and packed with increased explosives for a larger explosion than the hand-dart. They also typically contained a time fuse rather than the mechanical fuses of the hand-darts. The first whaling shoulder guns were introduced in 1846, they were lighter than swivel guns, had slightly more range than a hand-dart, and could fire a explosive or non-explosive lance weighing up to 3 lbs.

Later in the 1800s larger whaling guns, commonly mounted on swivels and known as bow guns or harpoon cannons, were introduced. They had similar features to their shoulder fired cousins, though were significantly larger. In 1864 Norwegian Svend Foyn invented explosive harpoons meant for the bow guns. These were the direct predecessor to modern swivel harpoon guns.

In 1865 a improvement to the original bomb-lances was invented by Eben Pierce of Massachusetts, known as the darting gun. The weapon was a ordinary harpoon pole but had lugs to carry a special harpoon tip that had a small gun and bomb-lance

Through the 20th century larger breech-loading swivels guns were popularized. They used steel harpoons around 6 ft long and weighing 120 lbs. Explosive tips for the harpoons were created soon after, with re-usable bodies connected to a rope and a large explosive charge at the very tip for the harpoon.

== Types ==
'Mounted' is a term for a broad range of explosive harpoons. As this variant can be mounted onto a ship, it is generally larger and more powerful than a hand-thrown explosive harpoon. Mounted harpoons are spring operated as explosive discharges - which are more common in other forms of harpoons - have proven to be volatile and delicate in the 'mounted' variant.

Hand thrown harpoons have been developed over time and now incorporate a gun or a ballistic type firing system.

== Use ==
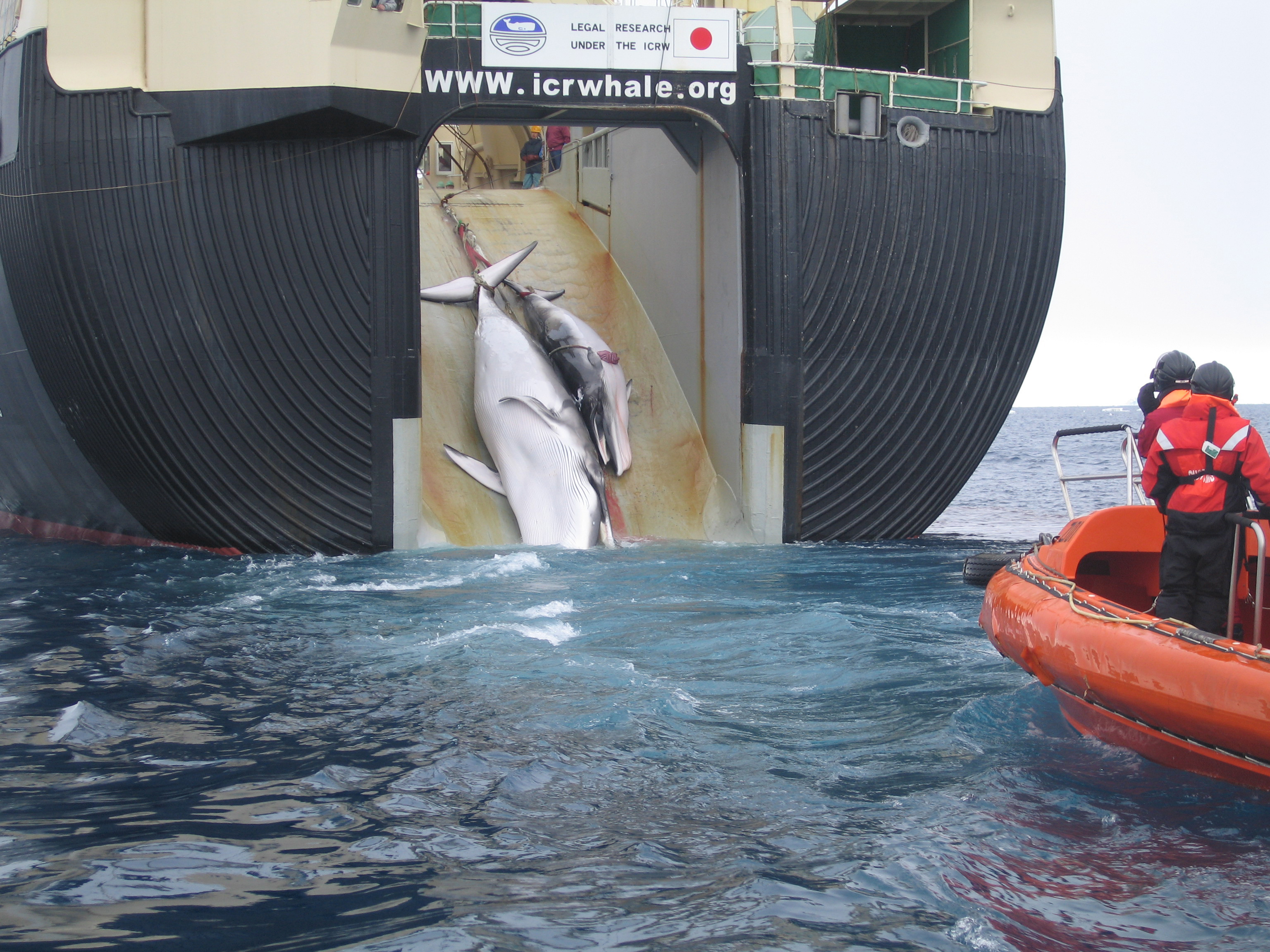
Adult and juvenile minke whales dragged aboard a Japanese ship; the wound on the juvenile was reportedly caused by an explosive harpoon

The explosive harpoon has historically only been used for whaling. Due to Oliver Allen’s improvements to the device, it can now be used on a smaller scale and in common practices like spearfishing.

== See also ==
- Harpoon cannon
- Svend Foyn
- Whaling
