= Long way to the top =

Long way to the top may refer to:

- Long Way to the Top, a 2001 Australian television documentary, associated book, and concert tour
- Long Way To The Top (album), a 1980 album by Nantucket
- "It's a Long Way to the Top (If You Wanna Rock 'n' Roll)", a 1975 song by Australian hard rock band AC/DC
