= No Direction Home (disambiguation) =

No Direction Home is a 2005 Martin Scorsese documentary on the life of singer-songwriter Bob Dylan.

No Direction Home may also refer to:

- The Bootleg Series Vol. 7: No Direction Home: The Soundtrack, a 2005 rarities compilation album that accompanies the film
- No Direction Home (album), a 1983 album by Nantucket
- "No Direction Home" (Billions), a 2021 television episode
