= Michael Gardner (disambiguation) =

Michael Gardner may refer to:

- Michael Gardner, American politician
- Mike Gardner, American football coach
- Michael Gardner, guitarist with rock trio PKM, see No Direction Home
- Michael Gardner, co-founder of Peachpit Press 1986 and co-author of the company's first book, LaserJet Unlimited

== See also ==
- Mick Gardner, Australian politician
- Michael Gardiner (disambiguation)
