= Michael Gardiner (disambiguation) =

Michael Gardiner (born 1979) is a former Australian rules footballer.

Michael Gardiner may also refer to:

- Michael Gardiner (soldier) (died 1584) Scottish soldier
- Mike Gardiner (born 1965), baseball pitcher
- Michael Gardiner (footballer, born 1978), Australian rules footballer for Collingwood

== See also ==
- Michael Gardner (disambiguation)
