= Still Live after All These Years =

Live album by Nantucket
- Released: 1995
- Recorded: 1991
- Genre: Hard rock
- Length: 77:25 (latest CD release)
- Label: Zella
- Producer: Daniel Brunty & Nantucket

Nantucket chronology
The Best of Nantucket (1986)	Still Live after All These Years (1995)	The Unreleased "D.C. Tapes" (2006)

Still Live after All These Years is a live album from North Carolina music group Nantucket, recorded November 29, 1991 with all six original band members at a night club called The Longbranch in Raleigh, North Carolina. There were twenty songs on the original 1995 album (though some other sources say seventeen), including a new studio release, but only sixteen songs are on the latest re-release by the band's own label Zella Records.

== Track listing ==
1. Rugburn - 4:08
2. It's Getting Harder - 3:48
3. Born in a Honky Tonk - 4:44
4. What's the Matter with Loving You - 5:07
5. On the Radio - 3:28
6. Southern Gals - 5:59
7. 50 More - 5:31
8. Time Bomb - 3:20
9. Is It Wrong to Rock and Roll - 6:06
10. Heartbreaker - 8:36
11. Quite Like You - 3:45
12. I Can't Stop Loving You - 4:53
13. Your Place or Mine - 3:45
14. California - 4:58
15. Never Gonna Take Your Lies - 3:51
16. Real Romance - 5:24

Other tracks included on original release

- Party Girl Deluxe [Track #9]
- Shotgun [Track #15]
- I Saw Elvis (At The Burger King) [Track #16]
- Sugar Shack [Track #20]

All other songs on album remained in same order.

== Personnel ==
- Tommy Redd: Lead & Rhythm Guitars, Lead & Background Vocals
- Larry Uzzell: Lead & Background Vocals, Trumpet, Percussion
- Mike Uzzell: Moog Bass, Various Keyboards & Synthesizers, Lead & Background Vocals
- Eddie Blair: Saxophones, Keyboards, Percussion, Background Vocals
- Kenny Soule: Drums & Percussion, Background Vocals
- Mark Downing: Lead & Rhythm Guitars

== Additional musicians ==
- Michael Gardner: Guitar
- David "Thumbs" Johnson: Bass
