= Nantucket sleighride =

Dragging of a whaleboat by a harpooned whale while whaling

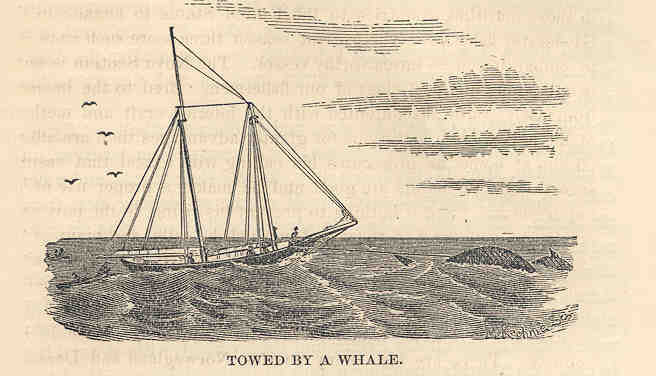
A boat being taken for a “Nantucket sleighride”

A Nantucket sleighride is the dragging of a whaleboat by a harpooned whale while whaling, although the dragging may also be done by other aquatic animals, such as whale sharks. It is an archaic term from the early days of open-boat whaling, when the animals were harpooned from small open boats. Once harpooned, the whale, in pain from its wound, attempts to flee, but the rope attached to the harpoon drags the whalers' boat along with it. The term refers to Nantucket, Massachusetts, the center of the American whaling industry; as well as the speed associated with riding in a horse-drawn sleigh. The term wasn't used by whalemen themselves, but was probably invented by a late 19th-century journalist.

A Nantucket sleighride was extremely dangerous. The speed would vary depending on the species of the whale; humpback whales, for example, gave a faster ride. The sperm whale caused the longest drag events, reaching speeds of 23 mph (37 km/h). The length of the drag lasted until the animal had no more energy. Fin whales and blue whales were the most dangerous species, as they would dive scores of fathoms deep, trying to take the whaleboat and its occupants beneath the surface. Once the whale had exhausted its energy, the sailors pulled in the rope, killed the animal, and rowed it back to the whaling ship, where they would butcher the carcass, remove its blubber, and render its oil.

Towards the turn of the twentieth century, the development of the whaling industry led to large factory ships with a fleet of steam-driven whale catchers armed with harpoon guns. Sailors no longer needed to risk their lives in whaleboats, and so the Nantucket sleighride came to an end. A few countries still allow aboriginal whaling, which takes place from small boats.

== Gallery ==
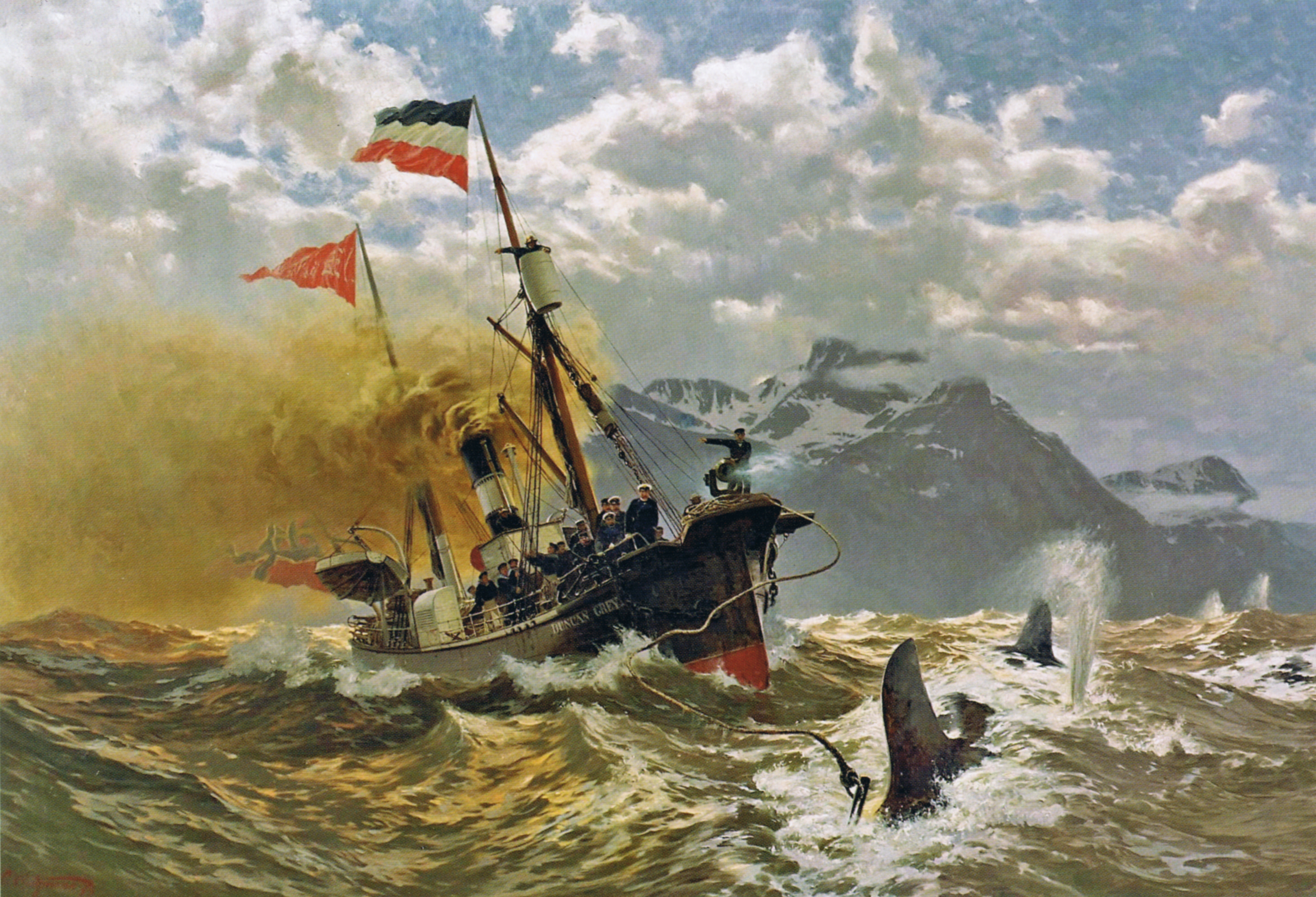
A steam-powered whaleship with a bow-mounted harpoon (circa 1907) was in much less danger.

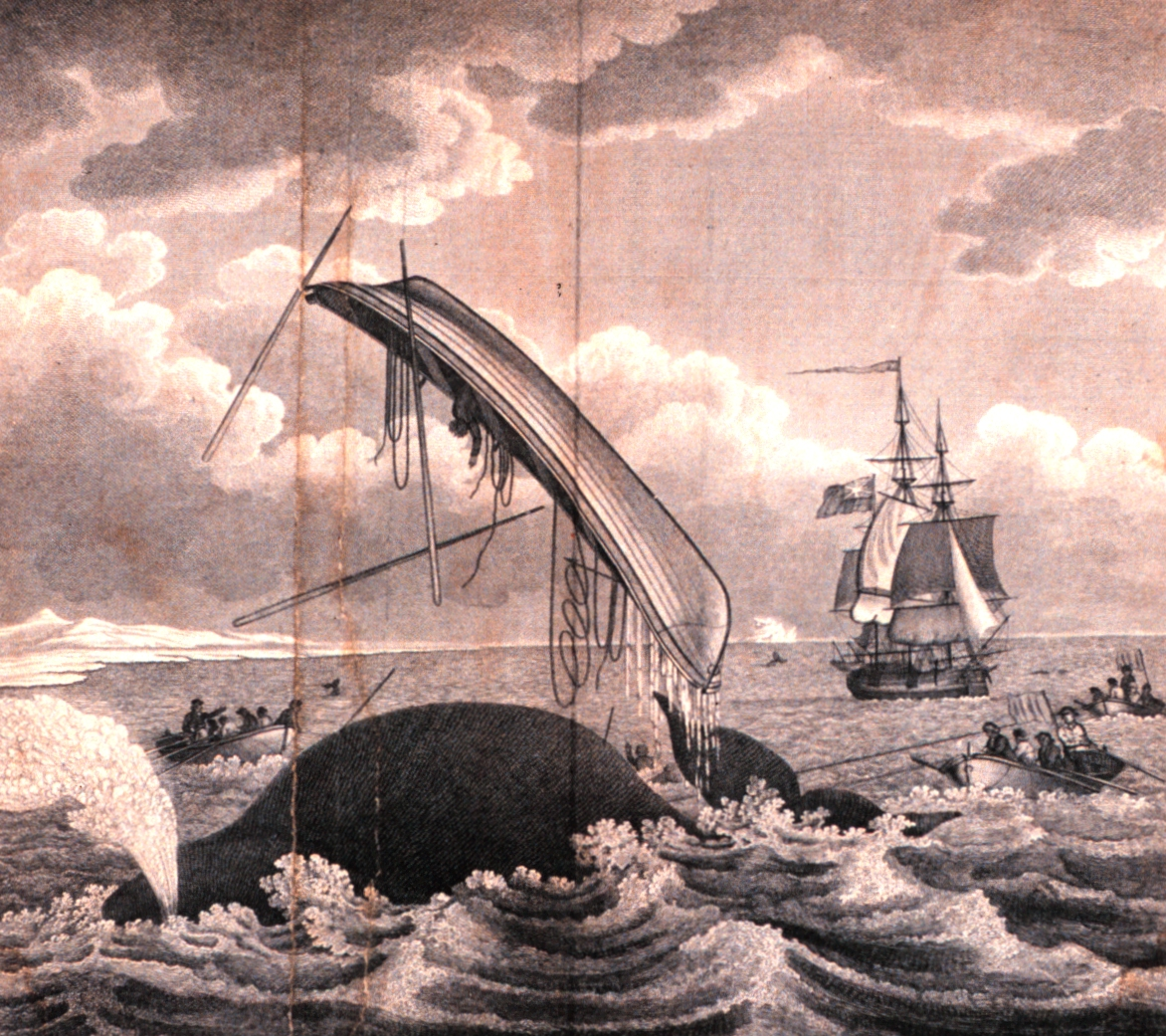
Dangers of the "whale fishery" in 1820. Note the taut ropes on the right, lines leading from the open boats to the harpooned animal.
