= Whaling =

Hunting of whales

Number of whales killed since 1900―2018

Whaling is the hunting of whales for their products such as meat and blubber, which can be turned into a type of oil that was important in the Industrial Revolution. Although it remains unclear where whaling was practiced as an organized industry for the first time, the earliest documentation demonstrating a well-established industry are from the year 1026 from the Basque coastal regions of Spain and France. From there, the whaling industry spread throughout the North Atlantic and later to the rest of the world and became very profitable in terms of trade and resources. Some regions of the world's oceans, along the animals' migration routes, had a particularly dense whale population and became targets for large concentrations of whaling ships, and the industry continued to grow well into the 20th century. The depletion of some whale species to near extinction led to the banning of whaling in many countries by 1969 and to an international cessation of whaling as an industry in the late 1980s.

Archaeological evidence suggests the earliest known forms of subsistence whaling on small cetaceans date to at least 3000 BC, practiced by the Inuit and other peoples in the North Atlantic and North Pacific. According to archaeological evidence from a 2026 study, the earliest form of whaling targeting baleen whales dates back at least 5,000 years ago (3,000 BC) and was estimated to have been practiced by indigenous peoples in southern Brazil. Coastal communities around the world have long histories of subsistence use of cetaceans, by dolphin drive hunting and by harvesting drift whales. Widespread commercial whaling emerged with organized fleets of whaling ships in the 17th century; competitive national whaling industries in the 18th and 19th centuries; and the introduction of factory ships and explosive harpoons along with the concept of whale harvesting in the first half of the 20th century. By the late 1930s, more than 50,000 whales were killed annually. In 1982, the International Whaling Commission (IWC) decided that there should be a 5-year pause on commercial whaling on all whale species from 1986 onwards because of the extreme depletion of most of the whale stocks. However, despite its initial temporary nature, the measure has been indefinitely extended.

Contemporary whaling for whale meat is subject to intense debate. Iceland, Japan, Norway, North American indigenous peoples, Bequia, the Danish dependencies of the Faroe Islands and Greenland, and Lembata (Indonesia) continue to hunt in the 21st century. The IWC ban on commercial whaling has been very successful, with only Iceland, Japan and Norway still engaging in and supporting commercial hunting. They also claim that the moratorium was approved as a temporary measure and that scientific studies show that many whale populations have fully recovered, and they support having the IWC moratorium lifted on certain whale stocks for hunting. Anti-whaling countries and environmental activists oppose lifting the ban. Under the terms of the IWC moratorium, aboriginal whaling is allowed to continue on a subsistence basis. Over the past few decades, whale watching has become a significant industry in many parts of the world; in some countries it has replaced whaling, but in a few others the two business models exist in an uneasy tension. The live capture of cetaceans for display in aquaria (e.g., captive killer whales) continues.

== History ==
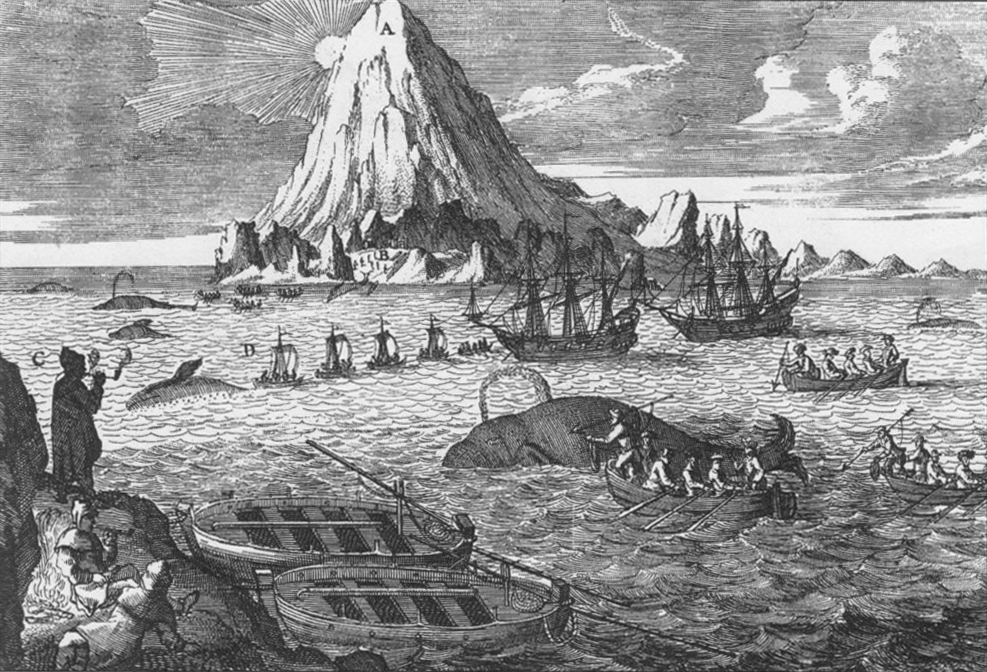
18th century engraving showing Dutch whalers hunting bowhead whales in the Arctic

Whaling began in prehistoric times in coastal waters. The earliest depictions of what appears to be the hunting of small cetaceans are the Neolithic Bangudae Petroglyphs in Korea, which may date back to 6000 BC. In other areas stranded cetaceans were also used. Although prehistoric hunting and gathering is generally considered to have had little ecological impact, early whaling in the Arctic may have altered freshwater ecology.

Early whaling affected the development of widely disparate cultures on different continents. The Basques were the first to catch whales commercially and dominated the trade for five centuries, spreading to the far corners of the North Atlantic and even reaching the South Atlantic. The development of modern whaling techniques was spurred in the 19th century by the increase in demand for whale oil, sometimes known as "train oil", and in the 20th century by a demand for margarine and later whale meat.

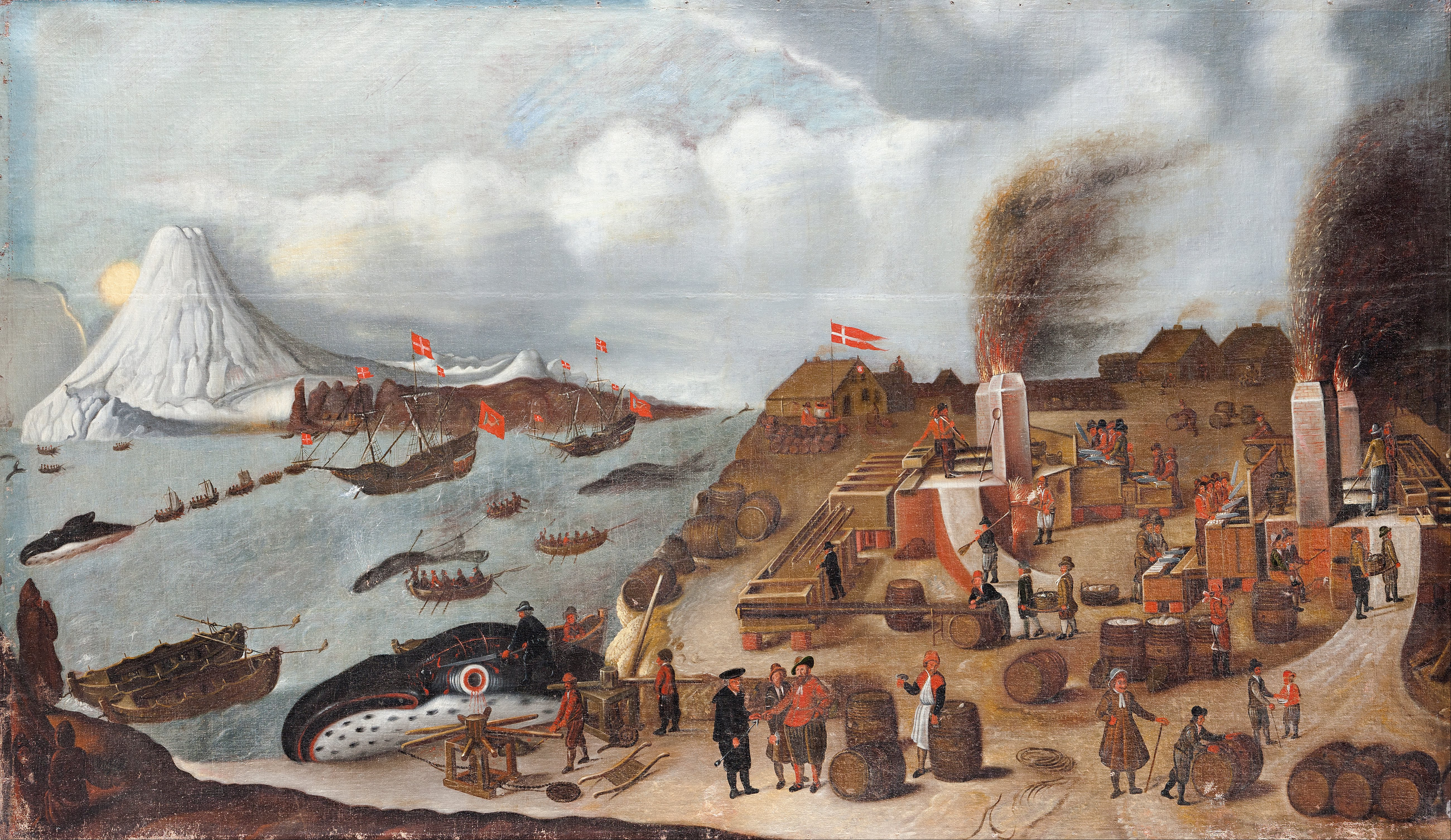
Whaling on Danes Island, by Abraham Speeck, 1634. Skokloster Castle

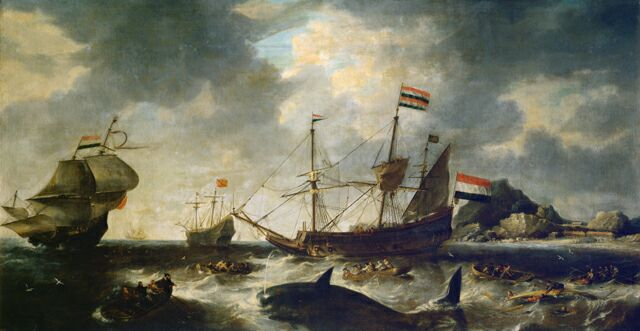
One of the oldest known whaling paintings, by Bonaventura Peeters, depicting Dutch whalers at Spitzbergen c. 1645

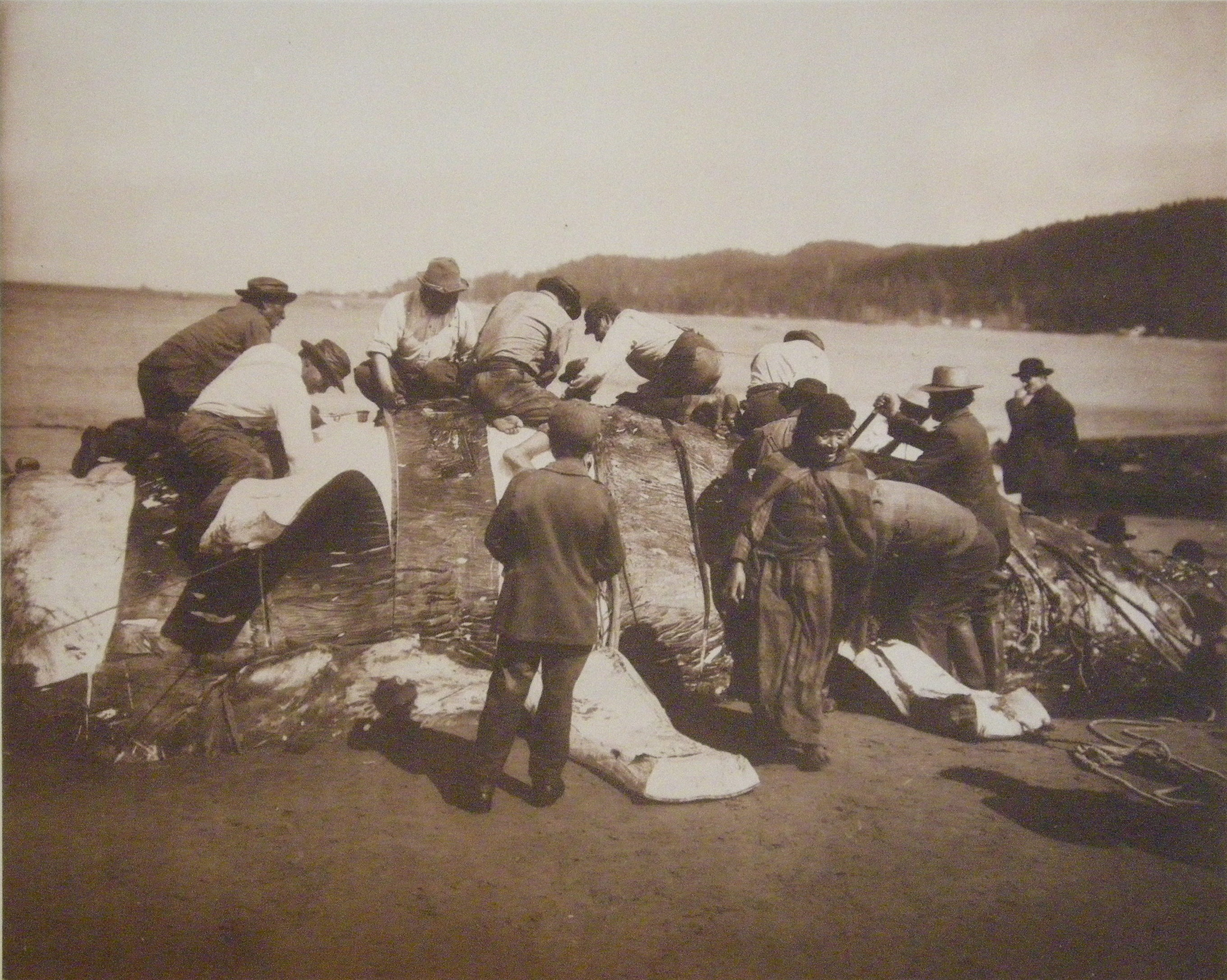
Native Americans Stripping Their Prey at Neah Bay – 1910

== Modernity ==
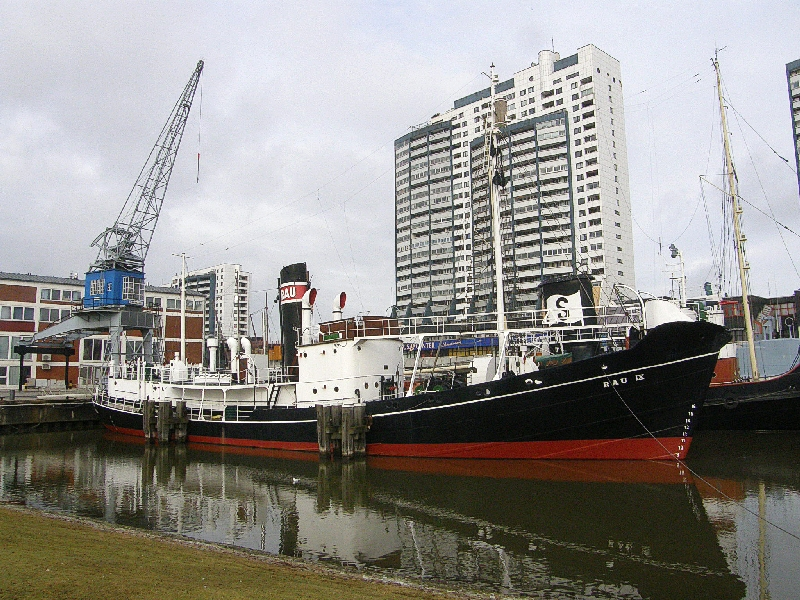
The Rau IX, a whaling ship built in 1939 for the German margarine company Walter Rau AG, now part of the collection of the German Maritime Museum. Whale oil was an important ingredient of margarine and the company operated its own whaling ships

The primary species hunted are minke whales, belugas, narwhals, and pilot whales, which are some of the smallest species of whales. There are also smaller numbers killed of gray whales, sei whales, fin whales, bowhead whales, Bryde's whales, sperm whales and humpback whales. A surveys in 2010s estimated a population of 150,000 minkes in the north Atlantic.

Whale oil is used little today, and modern whaling is primarily done for food: for pets, fur farms, sled dogs and humans, and for making carvings of tusks, teeth and vertebrae. Both meat and blubber (muktuk) are eaten from narwhals, belugas and bowheads. From commercially hunted minkes, meat is eaten by humans or animals, and blubber is rendered down mostly to cheap industrial products such as animal feed or, in Iceland, as a fuel supplement for whaling ships.

International cooperation on whaling regulation began in 1931 and culminated in the signing of the International Convention for the Regulation of Whaling (ICRW) in 1946. Its aim is to "provide for the proper conservation of whale stocks and thus make possible the orderly development of the whaling industry".

=== International Whaling Commission ===
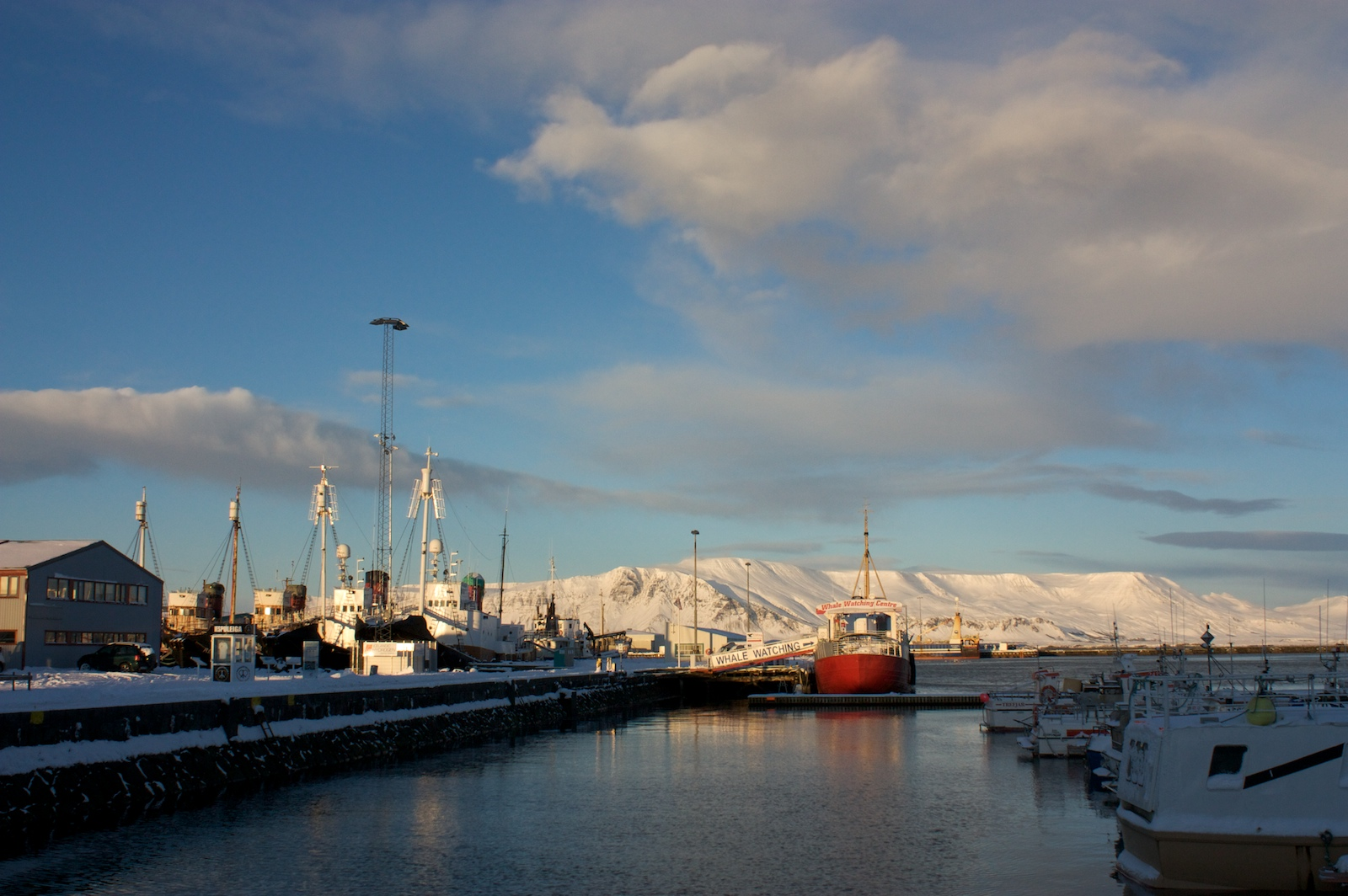
To the left, the black-hulled whaling ships. To the right, the red-hulled whale-watching ship. Iceland, 2011.

The International Whaling Commission (IWC) was set up under the ICRW to decide hunting quotas and other relevant matters based on the findings of its Scientific Committee. Non-member countries are not bound by its regulations and conduct their own management programs. It regulates hunting of 13 species of great whales and has not reached consensus on whether it may regulate smaller species.

The IWC voted on July 23, 1982, to establish a 5-year moratorium on commercial whaling of great whales beginning in the 1985–86 season. Since its end in 1992, the IWC's Scientific Committee has requested that it be allowed to give quota proposals for some whale stocks, but this has so far been refused by the Plenary Committee.

At the 2010 meeting in Morocco, representatives of the 88 member states discussed whether to lift the 24-year ban on commercial whaling. Japan, Norway and Iceland urged the organisation to lift the ban. A coalition of anti-whaling nations offered a compromise plan that would allow these countries to continue whaling but with smaller catches and under close supervision. Their plan would also completely ban whaling in the Southern Ocean. More than 200 scientists and experts opposed the compromise proposal for lifting the ban and have also opposed allowing whaling in the Southern Ocean, which was declared a whale sanctuary in 1994. However, arguing that the measure had been approved as a temporary measure of only five years and lacked a robust scientific basis, Iceland, Norway and Japan lodged reservations to the moratorium or withdrew from the IWC and have continued hunting whales under national quotas to this day. Though the IWC pioneered the international regulation of fishery resources, it eventually became a victim of its own success, as its regulatory work was surpassed by the momentum of a social perception forged in earlier times, when whaling was unregulated and overexploited.

=== Whaling catches by location ===
These totals include great whales: counts from IWC and WDC and IWC Summary Catch Database version 6.1, July 2016.

The IWC database is supplemented by Faroese catches of pilot whales, Greenland's and Canada's catches of narwhals (data 1954–2014), belugas from multiple sources shown in the Beluga whale article, Indonesia's catches of sperm whales, and bycatch in Korea.

Whales caught, by country and species, 2010–2014
Species Country	Practice	Total	Minke (Note: The common minke is listed as 'Least-concern (LC)' while the Antarctic minke is listed as 'Near-threatened (NT)'.)	Beluga	Narwhal	Pilot	Gray	Sei	Fin	Bowhead	Bryde's	Sperm	Humpback	Orca
Total		21,008	5,663	4,831	4,549	3,699	642	486	460	323	189	108	57	2
Canada	Aboriginal	4,510	—N/a	1,626	2,870	—N/a	—N/a	—N/a	—N/a	15	—N/a	—N/a	—N/a	—N/a
Greenland	Aboriginal	3,953	875	1,316	1,679	—N/a	—N/a	—N/a	37	4	—N/a	—N/a	42	—N/a
Faroe Islands	Aboriginal	3,698	—N/a	—N/a	—N/a	3,698	—N/a	—N/a	—N/a	—N/a	—N/a	—N/a	—N/a	—N/a
Norway	Commercial	2,795	2,795	—N/a	—N/a	—N/a	—N/a	—N/a	—N/a	—N/a	—N/a	—N/a	—N/a	—N/a
Japan	Commercial	2,080	1,396	—N/a	—N/a	—N/a	—N/a	486	3	—N/a	187	8	—N/a	—N/a
United States	Aboriginal	1,887	—N/a	1,586	—N/a	—N/a	—N/a	—N/a	—N/a	301	—N/a	—N/a	—N/a	—N/a
Russia	Aboriginal	948	—N/a	303	—N/a	—N/a	642	—N/a	—N/a	3	—N/a	—N/a	—N/a	—N/a
Iceland	Commercial	648	229	—N/a	—N/a	—N/a	—N/a	—N/a	419	—N/a	—N/a	—N/a	—N/a	—N/a
South Korea	Commercial	376	368	—N/a	—N/a	1	—N/a	—N/a	1	—N/a	2	—N/a	2	2
Indonesia	Aboriginal	100	—N/a	—N/a	—N/a	—N/a	—N/a	—N/a	—N/a	—N/a	—N/a	100	—N/a	—N/a
Saint Vincent and the Grenadines	Aboriginal	13	—N/a	—N/a	—N/a	—N/a	—N/a	—N/a	—N/a	—N/a	—N/a	—N/a	13	—N/a
IUCN Classification: Least-concern , Endangered , Vulnerable , Data deficient

== Ongoing debate ==
Key elements of the debate over whaling include sustainability, ownership, national sovereignty, cetacean intelligence, suffering during hunting, health risks, the value of 'lethal sampling' to establish catch quotas, the value of controlling whales' impact on fish stocks and the rapidly approaching extinction of a few whale species.

=== Sustainability ===
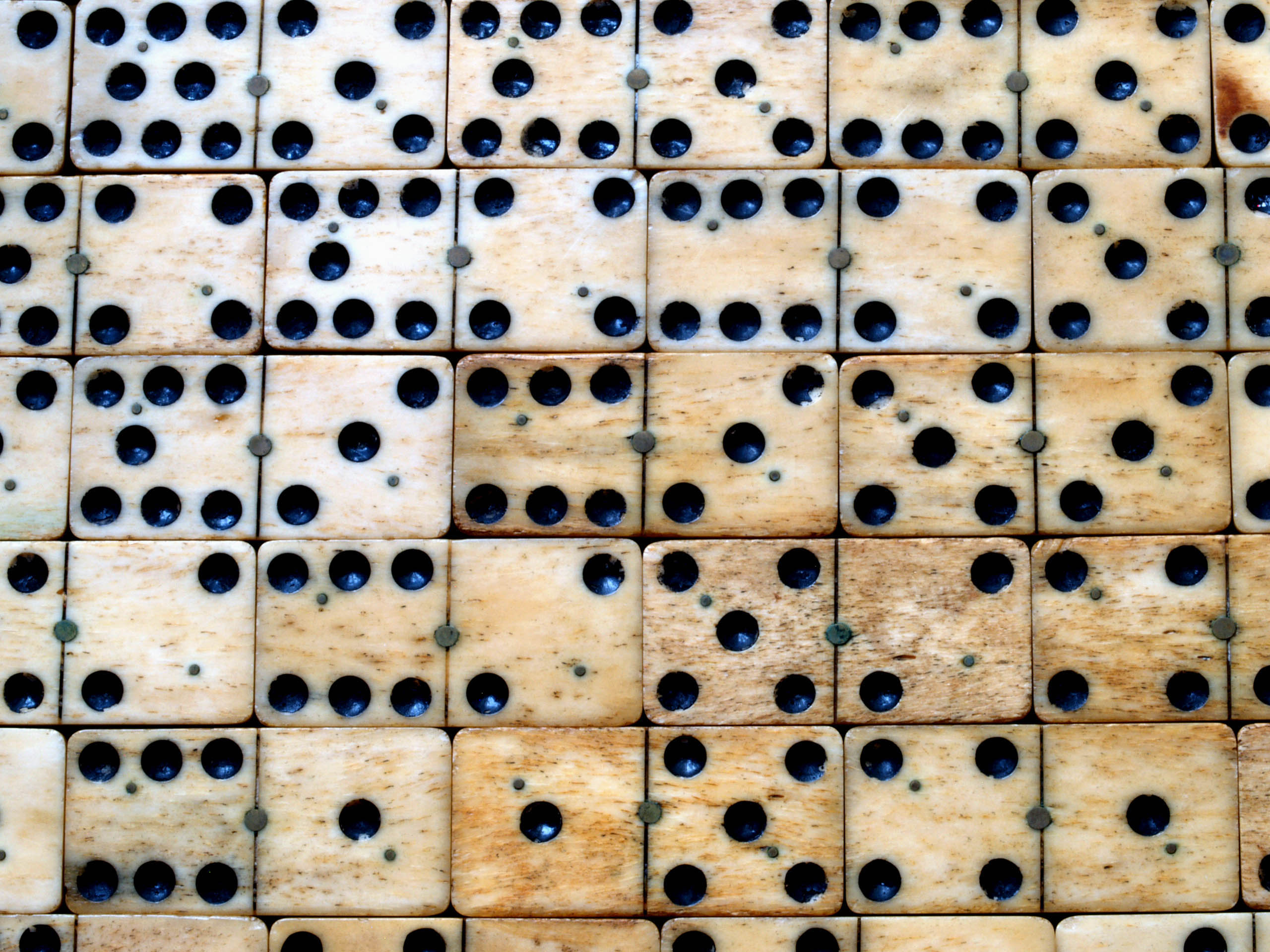
Dominoes made from whale bones

The World Wide Fund for Nature says that 90% of all northern right whales killed by human activities are from ship collisions, calling for restrictions on the movement of shipping in certain areas. Noise pollution threatens the existence of cetaceans. Large ships and boats make a tremendous amount of noise that falls into the same frequency range of many whales. Bycatch also kills more animals than hunting. Some scientists believe pollution to be a factor. Moreover, since the IWC moratorium, there have been several instances of illegal whale hunting by IWC nations. In 1994, the IWC reported evidence from genetic testing of whale meat and blubber for sale on the open market in Japan in 1993. In addition to the legally permitted minke whale, the analyses showed that 10–25% of tissues sampled came from non-minke baleen whales. Further research in 1995 and 1996 showed a significant drop of non-minke baleen whales sampled to 2.5%. In a separate paper, Baker stated that "many of these animals certainly represent a bycatch (incidental entrapment in fishing gear)" and stated that DNA monitoring of whale meat is required to adequately track whale products.

It was revealed in 1994 that the Soviet Union had been systematically undercounting its catch. For example, from 1948 to 1973, the Soviet Union caught 48,477 humpback whales rather than the 2,710 it officially reported to the IWC. On the basis of this new information, the IWC stated that it would have to rewrite its catch figures for the last 40 years. According to Ray Gambell, then-Secretary of the IWC, the organization had raised its suspicions with the former Soviet Union, but it did not take further action because it could not interfere with national sovereignty.

=== Health risks ===
Small whales are long-lived predators, so their tissues build up concentrations of methylmercury from their prey. Mercury concentrations reach levels that are hazardous to humans who consume too much too often, since mercury also bioaccumulates in humans. High levels have been found in dolphins from the Caribbean (where people are advised not to exceed one serving every three weeks), in pilot whales from the Faroe Islands, and in dolphins and small whales from Japan.

=== Effects on global carbon cycles ===
Scientists have analyzed the ability of the oceans to sequester atmospheric carbon before industrial whaling and in modern times, hundreds of years after the most active whaling periods. Focusing on the amount of carbon stored in baleen whales, scientists determined that large marine mammals hold over 9 million less tons of carbon in the ocean than during the pre whaling era (9.1 x 10^6 tons).

Whales play an important role in the carbon cycle in life and death. Living whales cycle carbon and nitrogen throughout the water column via whale feces where it can contribute to primary productivity at the surface. In death, their carcasses can become part of a whale fall and sink to the bottom, bringing their carbon with them to help form a temporary ecosystem at the ocean floor. Despite rebounding whale numbers after the international ban on whaling, climate change and rising carbon levels continue to hinder the amount of carbon sequestered by whales.

== By country ==
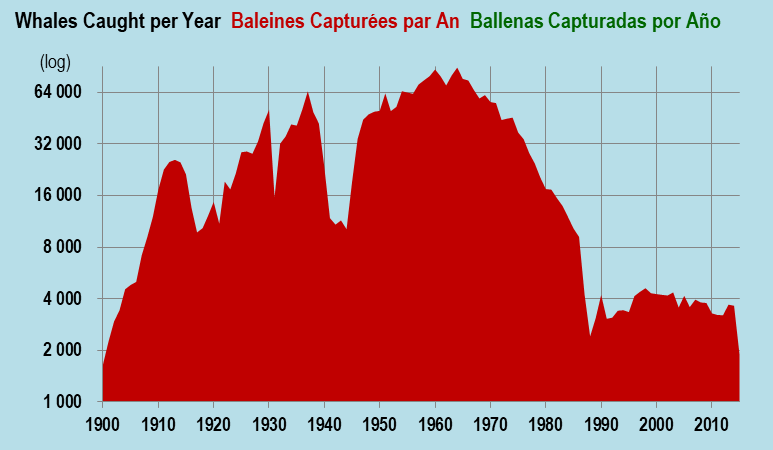
Whales caught per year, totals are shown on a logarithmic scale, 1900―2015

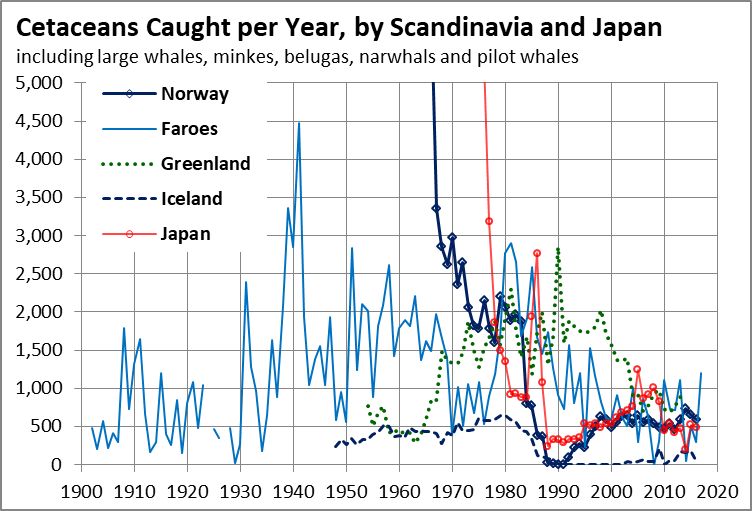
Whales caught per year by Scandinavia and Japan, 1902―2018

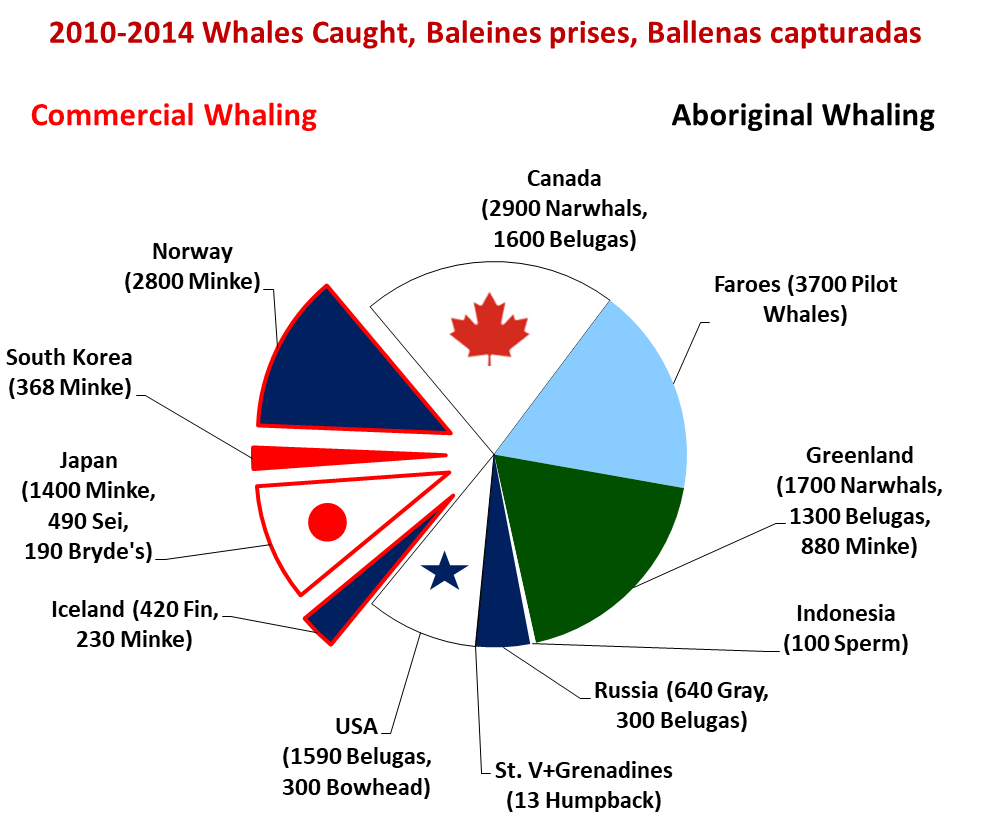
Whales caught by country, 2010―2014

=== Australia ===
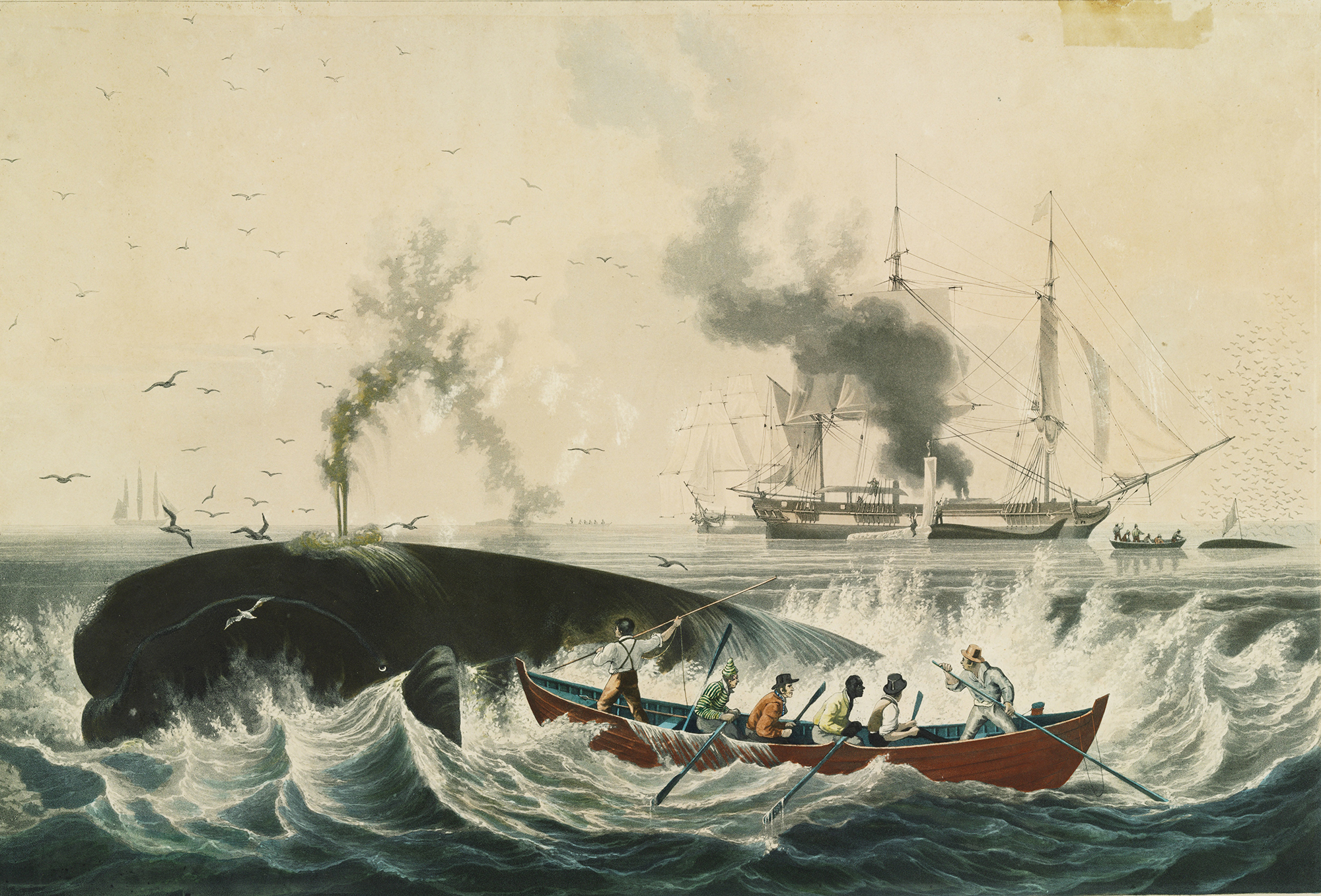
Catching and rendering whales, South Sea Whale Fishery, aquatint print, 1835

Whaling was a major maritime industry in Australia from 1791 until its final cessation in 1978. At least 45 whaling stations operated in Tasmania during the 19th century, and bay whaling was conducted out of other mainland centres. Modern whaling using harpoon guns and iron hulled catchers was conducted in the 20th century from shore-based stations in Western Australia, South Australia, New South Wales and Queensland, also in Norfolk Island. Overfishing saw the closure of some whaling stations before a government ban on the industry was introduced in 1978 after a major campaign by conservationists.

=== Canada ===
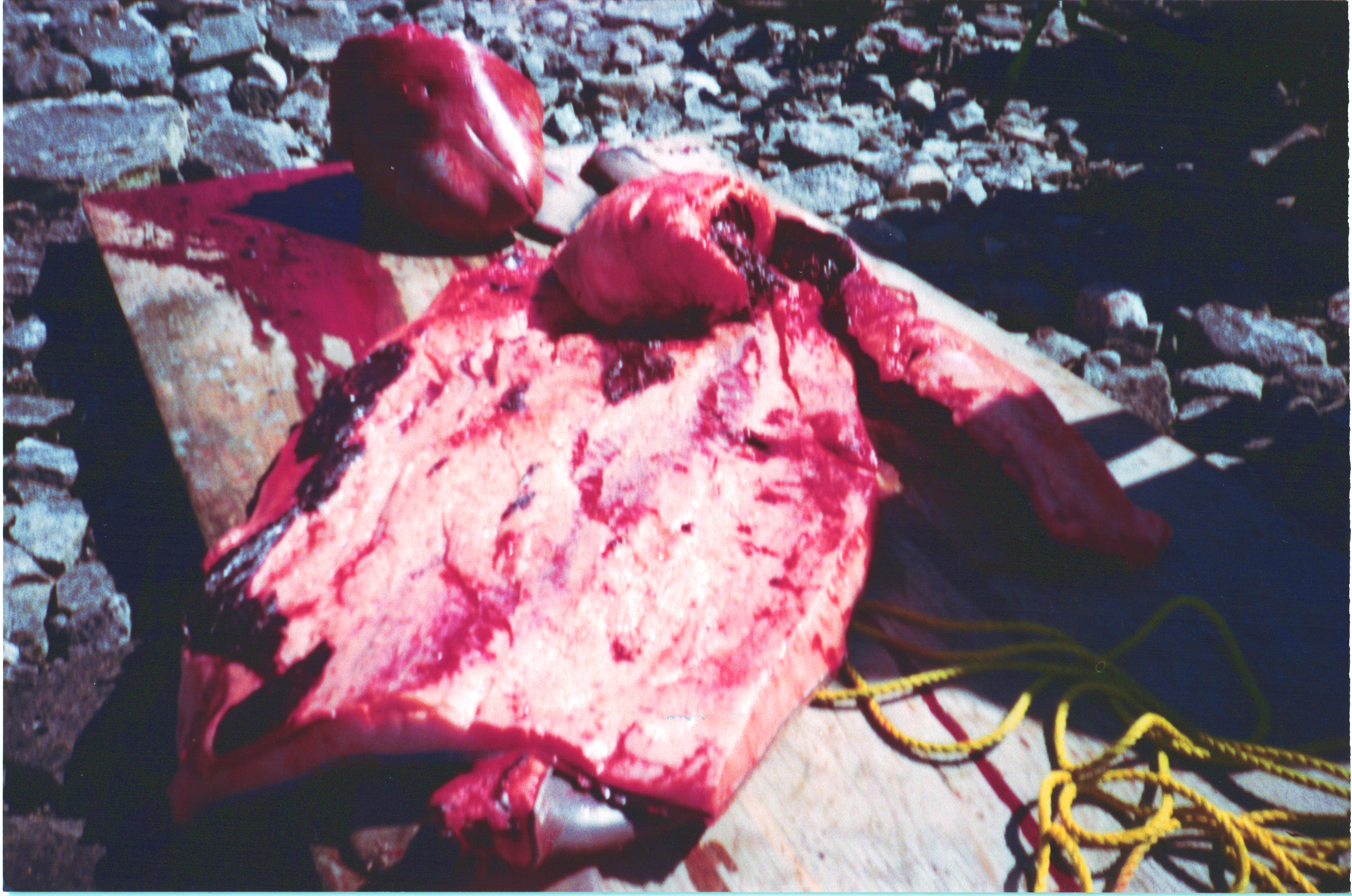
Young butchered beluga on the beach of the Inuit village of Salluit, Quebec, July 2001

Canadians kill about 600 narwhals per year. They kill 100 belugas per year in the Beaufort Sea, 300 in northern Quebec (Nunavik), and an unknown number in Nunavut. The total annual kill in Beaufort and Quebec areas varies between 300 and 400 belugas per year. Numbers are not available for Nunavut since 2003, when the Arviat area, with about half Nunavut's hunters, killed 200–300 belugas, though the authors say hunters resist giving complete numbers.

Harvested meat is sold through shops and supermarkets in northern communities where whale meat is a component of the traditional diet. Hunters in Hudson Bay rarely eat beluga meat. They give a little to dogs and leave the rest for wild animals. Other areas may dry the meat for later consumption by humans. An average of one or two vertebrae and one or two teeth per beluga or narwhal are carved and sold. One estimate of the annual gross value received from Beluga hunts in Hudson Bay in 2013 was CA$600,000 for 190 belugas, or CA$3,000 per beluga, and CA$530,000 for 81 narwhals, or CA$6,500 per narwhal. However the net income, after subtracting costs in time and equipment, was a loss of CA$60 per person for belugas and CA$7 per person for narwhals. Hunters receive subsidies, but they continue as a tradition rather than for the money, and the economic analysis noted that whale watching may be an alternate revenue source. Of the gross income, CA$550,000 was for beluga skin and meat, to replace beef, pork and chickens which would otherwise be bought, CA$50,000 was received for carved vertebrae and teeth. CA$370,000 was for narwhal skin and meat, CA$150,000 was received for tusks, and carved vertebrae and teeth of males, and CA$10,000 was received for carved vertebrae and teeth of female narwhals.

The Whale and Dolphin Conservation says: "Canada has pursued a policy of marine mammal management which appears to be more to do with political expediency rather than conservation."

Canada left the IWC in 1982, and the only IWC-regulated species currently harvested by the Canadian Inuit is the bowhead whale. As of 2004, the limit on bowhead whale hunting allows for the hunt of one whale every two years from the Hudson Bay-Foxe Basin population, and one whale every 13 years from the Baffin Bay-Davis Strait population.

=== Denmark ===
==== Faroe Islands ====
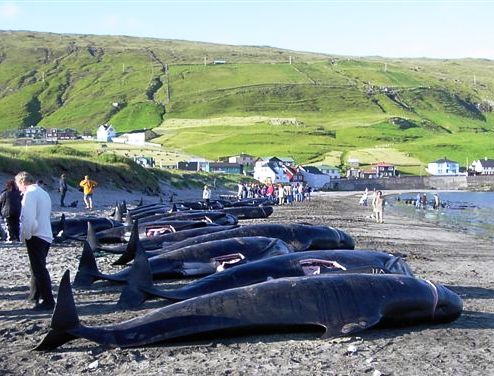
Killed pilot whales on the beach in Hvalba, Faroe Islands

The traditional whale hunt, known as grindadráp, is regulated by Faroese authorities but not by the IWC, which does not claim jurisdiction over small cetaceans. Around 800 long-finned pilot whales (Globicephala melaena) are caught each year, mainly during the summer. Other species are not hunted, though occasionally Atlantic white-sided dolphin can be found among the pilot whales.

==== Greenland ====
The Inuit mastered the art of whaling around the 11 century AD in the Bering Strait. The technique consisted of spearing a whale with a spear connected to an inflated seal bladder. The bladder would float and exhaust the whale when diving, and when it surfaced the Inuit hunters would spear it again, further exhausting the animal until they were able to kill it. Vikings in Greenland also ate whale meat, but archaeologists believe they never hunted them on the sea.

Greenlandic Inuit whalers catch around 175 large whales per year, mostly minke whales, as well as 360 narwhals, 200 belugas, 190 pilot whales and 2,300 porpoises. The government of Greenland sets limits for narwhals and belugas. There are no limits on pilot whales and porpoises.

The IWC treats the west and east coasts of Greenland as two separate population areas and sets separate quotas for each coast. The far more densely populated west coast accounts for over 90% of the catch. The average per year from 2012 to 2016 was around 150 minke and 17 fin whales and humpback whales taken from west coast waters and around 10 minke from east coast waters. In April 2009 Greenland landed its first bowhead whale in nearly 40 years. It landed three bowheads each year in 2009 and 2010, one each in 2011 and 2015.

In 2021 the Sermersooq municipal council banned whaling in Nuup Kangerlua, one of the largest fjords in inhabited areas of Greenland. The council did not want hunting to kill the humpback whales seen by the local tourism industry. Before local humpback hunting resumed in 2010 there had been nine humpbacks in the fjord during summer. When hunting resumed some were killed and others left. Sermersooq has not banned whaling elsewhere in the municipality, which is the world's largest municipality, at 200,000 square miles on both coasts.

=== Germany ===
Originally one of the most successful whaling nations, German whaling vessels started from Hamburg and other smaller cities on the Elbe River, hunting for whales around Greenland and Spitsbergen. While 1770 is recorded to have been the most successful year of German whaling, German whaling went into steep decline with the beginning of the Napoleonic Wars and never really recovered. After the Napoleonic Wars, Germany tried but could never re-establish a successful whaling industry.

German whaling ships in the mid to late 19th century would generally not be staffed with experienced sailors but rather with members of more wealthy farming communities, going for short trips to Scandinavia during the end of spring and beginning of summer, when their labor was not required on the fields. This kind of whaling was ineffective. Many journeys would not lead to any whales caught, instead seal- and polar bear skins were brought back to shore. Communities often paid more for equipping the vessels in the first place than making money with the goods brought back to shore. Today, local historians believe that German whaling in the late 19th century was more a rite of passage for the sons of wealthy farmers from northern German islands than an action undertaken for true commercial reason. German whaling was abandoned in 1872.

Prior to the First World War, the newly established German Empire attempted to re-establish large scale German whaling. This was undertaken with ships either going from Germany to Iceland or from the newly established German colonies to African waters. These attempts never were commercially successful and quickly given up. Only in the 1930s could Germany—with mainly Norwegian personnel—re-establish a large and successful whaling industry. More than 15,000 whales were caught between 1930 and 1939. With the beginning of the Second World War, German whaling was abandoned completely. In the early 1950s, Germany maintained one whaling vessel for testing purpose as it considered re-establishing a German whaling fleet, but abandoned these plans in 1956. The last remaining German whalers worked for Dutch vessels in the 1950s and 1960s.

=== Iceland ===
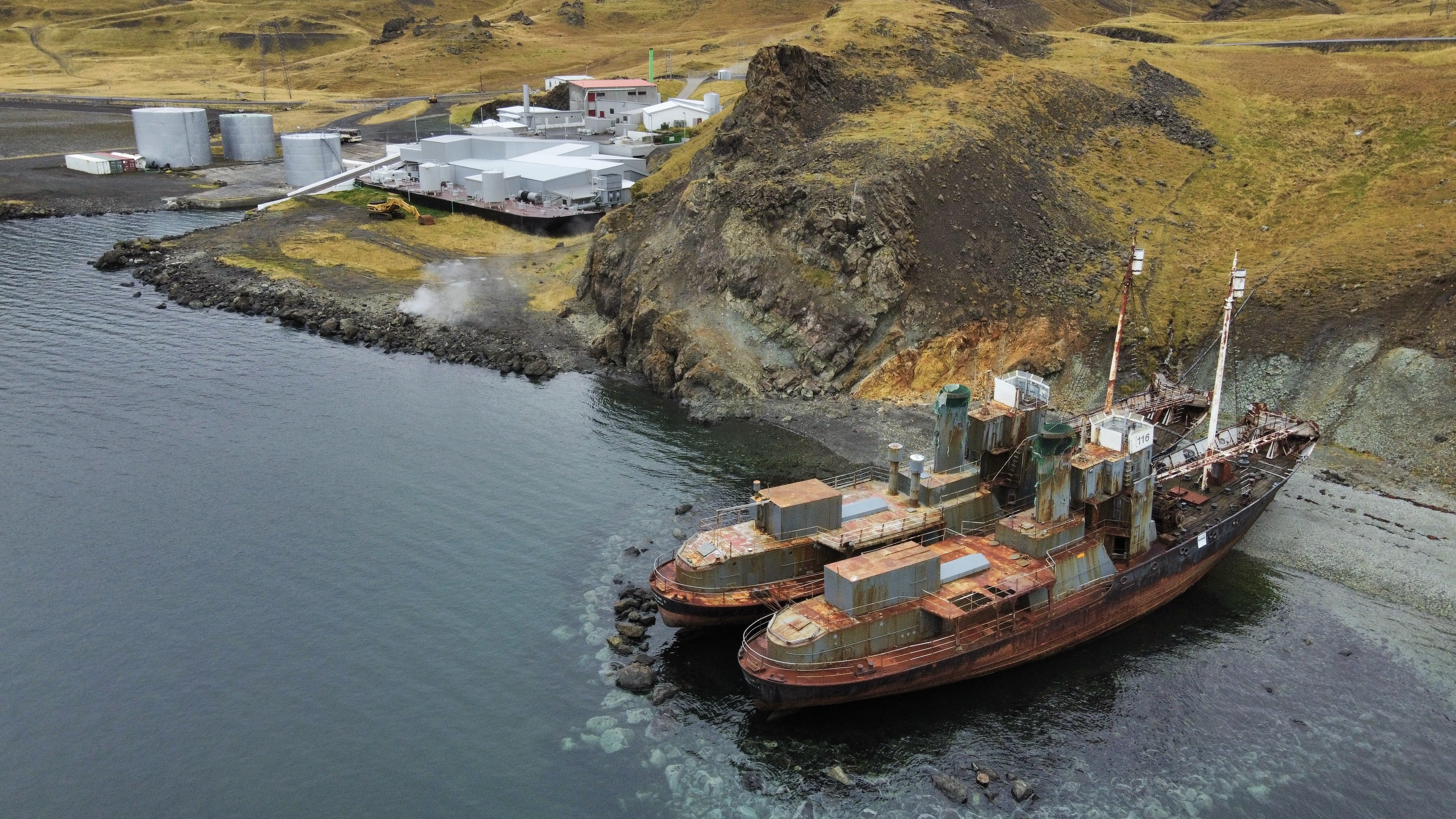
Hvalur hf.'s whaling station at Hvalfjörður (2023), with 2 abandoned whaling vessels. It owns 2 similar operational ships.

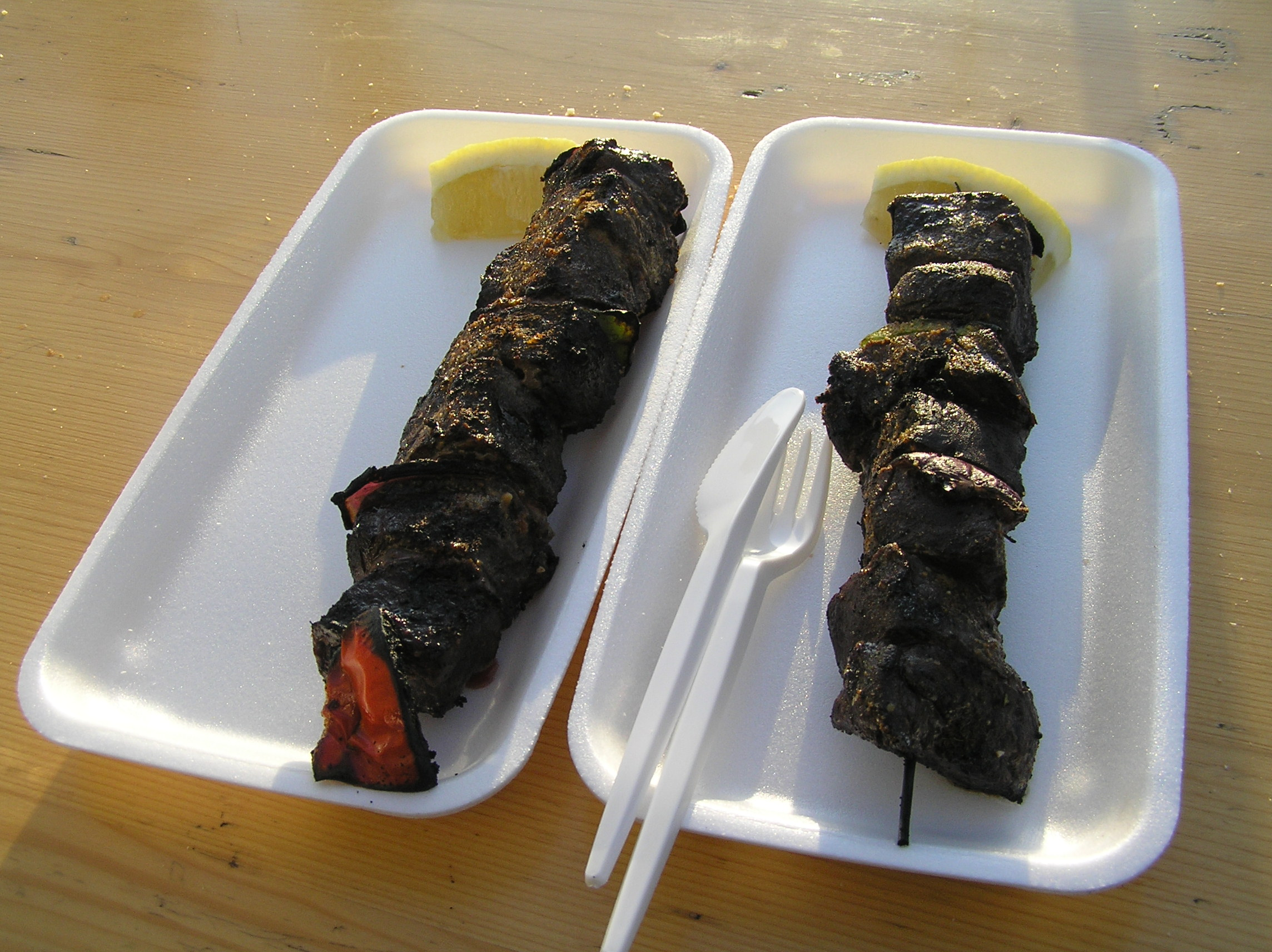
Grilled minke whale meat on a stick, sold in Reykjavík, Iceland, 2009

Iceland is one of a handful of countries which still host a privately owned whaling fleet. The company Hvalur hf. concentrates on hunting fin whales, largely for export to Japan, while the only other one hunts minke whales for domestic consumption, as the meat is popular with tourists. Iceland has its own whale watching sector, which exists in uneasy tension with the whaling industry.

Iceland did not object to the 1986 IWC moratorium. Between 1986 and 1989 around 60 animals per year were taken under a scientific permit. However, under strong pressure from anti-whaling countries, who viewed scientific whaling as a circumvention of the moratorium, Iceland ceased whaling in 1989. Following the IWC's 1991 refusal to accept its Scientific Committee's recommendation to allow sustainable commercial whaling, Iceland left the IWC in 1992.

Iceland rejoined the IWC in 2002 with a reservation to the moratorium. Iceland presented a feasibility study to the 2003 IWC meeting for catches in 2003 and 2004. The primary aim of the study was to deepen the understanding of fish–whale interactions. Amid disagreement within the IWC Scientific Committee about the value of the research and its relevance to IWC objectives, no decision on the proposal was reached. However, under the terms of the convention the Icelandic government issued permits for a scientific catch. In 2003 Iceland resumed scientific whaling which continued in 2004 and 2005.

Iceland resumed commercial whaling in 2006. Its annual quota was 30 minke whales (out of an estimated 174,000 animals in the central and north-eastern North Atlantic) and nine fin whales (out of an estimated 30,000 animals in the central and north-eastern North Atlantic). For the 2012 commercial whaling season, starting in April and lasting six months, the quota was set to 216 minke whales, of which 52 were caught. Iceland did not hunt any whales in 2019, and it is reported that demand for whale meat decreased in that year.

=== Indonesia ===
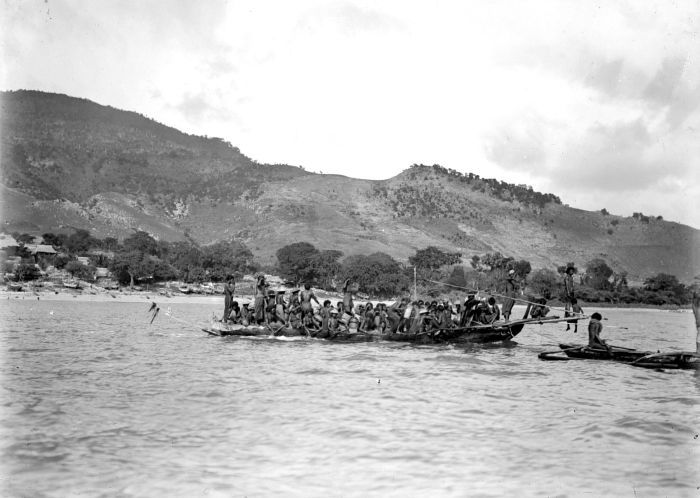
Lamakera whale hunters in a traditional boat called paledang, c. 1900

Lamalera, on the south coast of the island of Lembata, and Lamakera on neighbouring Solor, are the two remaining Indonesian whaling communities. The hunters obey religious taboos that ensure that they use every part of the animal. About half of the catch is kept in the village; the rest is bartered in local markets.

In 1973, the United Nations's Food and Agriculture Organization (FAO) sent a whaling ship and a Norwegian whaler to modernize their hunt. This effort lasted three years and was not successful. According to the FAO report, the Lamalerans "have evolved a method of whaling which suits their natural resources, cultural tenets and style." Lamalerans say they returned the ship because they immediately caught five sperm whales, too many to butcher and eat without refrigeration. Since these communities only hunt whales for noncommercial purposes, it is categorized as 'aboriginal subsistence hunters' by the IWC.

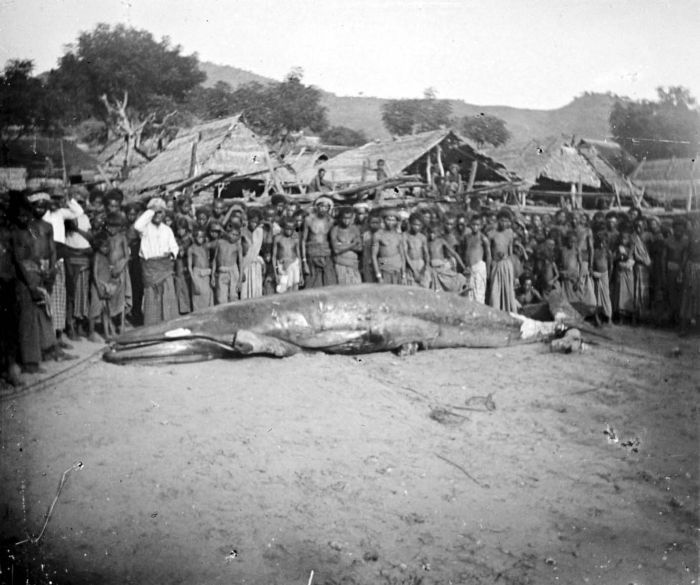
The catch of lamakerans

The Lamalerans hunt for several species of whales but catching sperm whales are preferable, while other whales, such as baleen whales, are considered taboo to hunt. They caught five sperm whales in 1973; they averaged about 40 per year from the 1960s through the mid 1990s, 13 total from 2002 to 2006, 39 in 2007, an average of 20 per year 2008 through 2014, and caught 3 in 2015.

Traditional Lamaleran whaling used wooden fishing boats built by a group of local craftsmen clan called ata molã, and the fishermen will mourn the "death" of their ships for two months. These days, the Lamalerans use a motor engine to power their boats; however, their tradition dictates that once a whale has been caught, fishermen will have to row their boats and the whale back to the shore. The traditional practices made whaling a dangerous hunt. In one case, a boat was pulled approximately 120 km away towards Timor (see Nantucket sleighride), while in another case, the hunted whale capsized the boat and forced the fishermen to swim for 12 hours back to the shore.

=== Japan ===
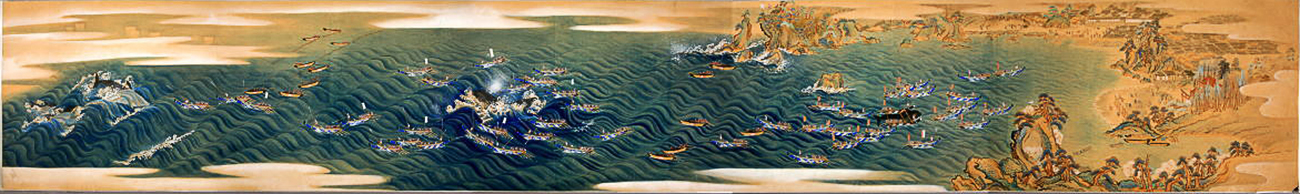
Japanese narrative screen showing a whale hunt off Wakayama

When the commercial whaling moratorium was introduced by the IWC in 1982, Japan lodged an official objection. However, in response to US threats to cut Japan's fishing quota in US territorial waters under the terms of the Packwood-Magnuson Amendment, Japan withdrew its objection in 1987. According to the BBC, the US went back on this promise, effectively destroying the deal. Since Japan could not resume commercial whaling, it began whaling on a purported scientific-research basis. Australia, Greenpeace, the Australian Marine Conservation Society, Sea Shepherd Conservation Society and other groups dispute the Japanese claim of research "as a disguise for commercial whaling, which is banned." The Sea Shepherd Conservation Society has attempted to disrupt Japanese whaling in the Antarctic since 2003 but eventually ceased this activity in 2017 due to little achievement in creating change. Other NGOs such as the Australian Marine Conservation Society and Humane Society International continued to campaign against Japan's scientific whaling program and block votes at IWC to bring back commercial whaling.

The stated purpose of the research program is to establish the size and dynamics of whale populations. The Japanese government wishes to resume whaling in a sustainable manner under the oversight of the IWC, both for whale products (meat, etc.) and to help preserve fishing resources by culling whales. Anti-whaling organizations claim that the research program is a front for commercial whaling, that the sample size is needlessly large and that equivalent information can be obtained by non-lethal means, for example by studying samples of whale tissue (such as skin) or feces. The Japanese government sponsored Institute of Cetacean Research (ICR), which conducts the research, disagrees, stating that the information obtainable from tissue and/or feces samples is insufficient and that the sample size is necessary in order to be representative.

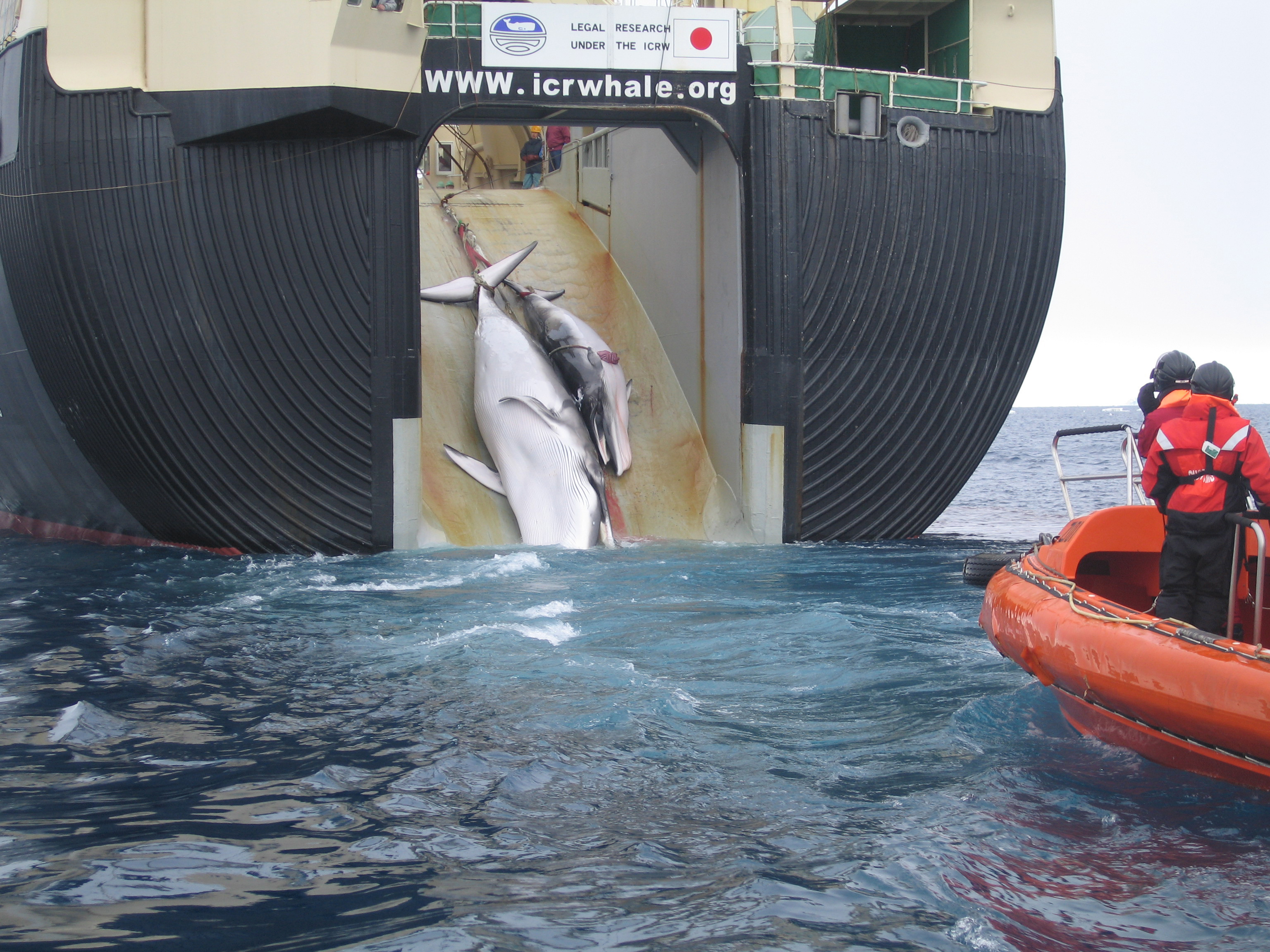
An adult and sub-adult minke whale are dragged aboard the Nisshin Maru, a Japanese whaling vessel.

Japan's scientific whaling program is controversial in anti-whaling countries. Countries opposed to whaling have passed non-binding resolutions in the IWC urging Japan to stop the program. Japan claims that whale stocks for some species are sufficiently large to sustain commercial hunting and blame filibustering by the anti-whaling side for the continuation of scientific whaling. Deputy whaling commissioner, Joji Morishita, told BBC News:

The reason for the moratorium [on commercial whaling] was scientific uncertainty about the number of whales. ... It was a moratorium for the sake of collecting data and that is why we started scientific whaling. We were asked to collect more data.

This collusive relationship between the whaling industry and the Japanese government is sometimes criticized by pro-whaling activists who support local, small-scale coastal whaling such as the Taiji dolphin drive hunt.

In September 2018, Japan chaired the 67th IWC meeting in Brazil and attempted to pass a motion to lift the moratorium on commercial whaling. Japan did not receive enough votes and the IWC rejected the motion. Subsequently, on 26 December 2018, Japan announced that it would withdraw its membership from the IWC, because in its opinion, the IWC had failed its duty to promote sustainable hunting as the culture within the IWC moved towards an anti-whaling, pro-conservation agenda. Japanese officials also announced they will resume commercial hunting within its territorial waters and its 200-mile exclusive economic zones starting in July 2019, but it will cease whaling activities in the Antarctic Ocean, the northwest Pacific Ocean, and the Australian Whale Sanctuary.

In 2019, the Australian Marine Conservation Society and International Fund for Animal Welfare commissioned legal opinion, which concluded that Japan's commercial whaling program within its territorial waters breaks international convention and law and that Japan makes itself vulnerable to potential international legal action.

=== Norway ===
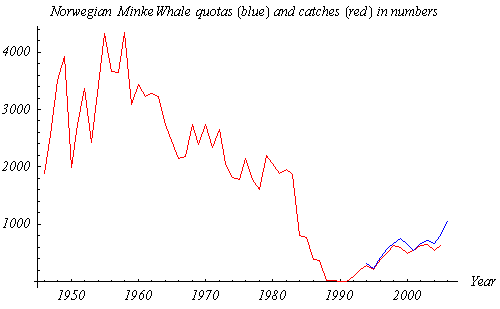
Norwegian catches (1946–2005) in red and quotas (1994–2006) in blue of minke whale, from Norwegian official statistics

Norway registered an objection to the International Whaling Commission moratorium and is thus not bound by it. Commercial whaling ceased for a five-year period to allow a small scientific catch for gauging the stock's sustainability; whaling subsequently resumed in 1993. Minke whales are the only legally hunted species. Catches have fluctuated between 487 animals in 2000 to 592 in 2007. For the year 2011 the quota is set at 1,286 minke whales. The catch is made solely from the Northeast Atlantic minke whale population, which is estimated at 102,000.

=== Philippines ===
Whaling in the Philippines has been illegal since 1997 since the Fisheries Administrative Order 185 of 1991 was amended. The order initially only made illegal the catching, selling, or transporting of dolphins but the 1997 amendment widened the scope of the ban to include all cetaceans including whales. The calls for ban on whaling and dolphin hunting in the Philippines were raised by both domestic and international groups after local whaling and dolphin hunting traditions of residents of Pamilacan in Bohol were featured in newspapers in the 1990s. As compromise for residents of Pamilacan who were dependent on whaling and dolphin hunting, whale and dolphin watching is being promoted in the island as a source of tourism income. Despite the ban, it is believed that the whaling industry in the Philippines did not cease to exist but went underground.

=== Russia ===
The USSR had a significant whaling hunt of orcas and dolphins along with Iceland and Japan. The Soviet Union's harvest of over 534,000 whales between the 1930s and the 1980s has been called "one of the most senseless environmental crimes of the 20th century" by Charles Homans of the Pacific Standard. In 1970, a study published by Bigg M.A. following photographic recognition of orcas found a significant difference in the suspected ages of whale populations and their actual ages. Following this evidence, the Soviet Union and then Russia continued a scientific whale hunt, though the verisimilitude of the intentions of the hunt over the last 40 years are questioned.

The Soviet Union's intensive illegal whaling program from 1948 to 1973 was controlled and managed by the central government. In Soviet society, whaling was perceived to be a glamorous and well-paid job. Whalers were esteemed as well-traveled adventurers, and their return to land was often celebrated elaborately such as with fanfare and parades. In regard to economics, the Soviet Union transformed from a "rural economy into an industrial giant" by disregarding the sustainability of a resource to fill high production targets. The government had controlled all industries, including fisheries, and whaling was not constrained by the need for sustainability through profits. Managers' and workers' production was incentivized with salary bonuses of 25%-60% and various other benefits, awards, and privileges. Many industries, whaling included, became a "manic numbers game".

Currently, the indigenous Chukchi people in Chukotka Autonomous Okrug in the Russian Far East are permitted under IWC regulation to take up to 140 gray whales from the North-East Pacific population each year. About 40 beluga whales are caught in the Sea of Okhotsk each year. There are no recent data on catches in the Arctic Ocean or Bering Sea, where about 60 belugas per year were caught in the early 1980s.

=== Saint Vincent and the Grenadines ===
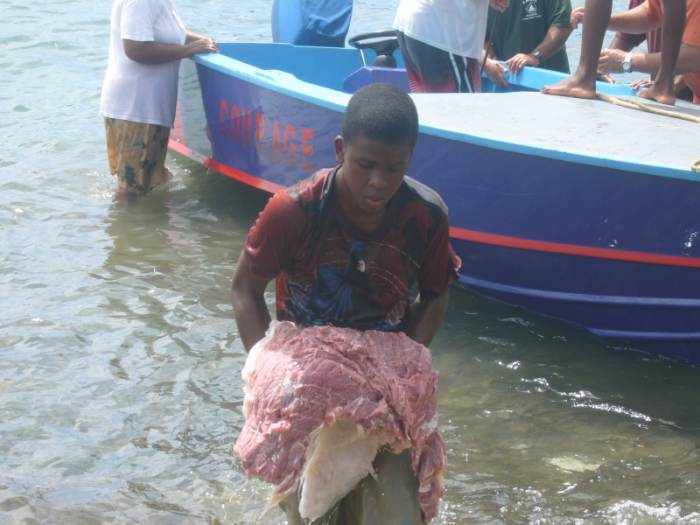
Boy in Bequia in the Grenadines carrying meat of a humpback whale (2007)

Natives of Saint Vincent and the Grenadines on the island of Bequia have a quota from the International Whaling Commission of up to four humpback whales per year. Their quota allows up to four humpback whales per year using only traditional hunting methods of hand-thrown harpoons in small, open sailboats. The limit is rarely met, with no catch some years. Its classification as aboriginal, and therefore permissible, is highly contested. In the 2012 meeting of the IWC, delegates from several anti-whaling countries, and environmental groups, spoke out against it, calling it "artisanal whaling out of control".

The meat is sold commercially and 82% of Bequia residents consume it at least occasionally, though it is subject to high levels of methyl mercury.

Residents of the town of Barrouallie hunt and sell meat from short-finned pilot whales and several dolphin species, including killer whales and false killer whales. 92% of people from the town, and high fractions from nearby towns, eat this meat at least occasionally. Sellers call this meat "black fish" without regard to species. Its levels of methyl mercury mean that consumption needs to be less than a serving every three weeks. However the mercury danger is not well known in the country. As of 2020 the government is considering banning the hunt of killer whales.

=== South Korea ===
Commercial whaling was banned in 1986 in South Korea in keeping with the IWC issued global moratorium on whale hunting. In early July 2012, during IWC discussions in Panama, South Korea said it would undertake scientific whaling as allowed despite the global moratorium on whaling. Due to a loud global outcry, South Korea abandoned this plan and has not resumed any form of whaling program.

There is still a loophole in South Korean laws that allows fishermen to keep any bycatch including whales. All whales caught accidentally must be reported and is then inspected for harpoon injuries. The meat from these whales can then be sold, which can be very lucrative for fishermen who can earn up to 200 million won ($150,000 US) per minke whale. This loophole has led to high numbers of whale, dolphin and other cetacean deaths. In 2023, the number was 866 recorded deaths, which is a sizable reduction from a high of 2,014 cases in 2019 and 1,066 in 2022, but is still worryingly high. Fishermen who abuse this loophole have been arrested and prosecuted, but activists have spoken out against this loophole, and demanded more protections for whales and better accounting for those caught and killed.

Due to their concern, and the higher than the global average numbers of bycatch cetacean deaths, 15 members of the Korean Parliament put forward a bill in 2023 to ban the consumption of whale meat and to have a more rigorous inspection of all whale carcasses by Coast Guards. Activists also want to have a database created that would help authorities spot more easily those who are using the loophole to illegally hunt whales.

The Bill raises hopes for better protections for whales but it will have to face a culture with deep historical, geographical and cultural ties to whale meat, and opposition from the commercial fishing industry.

=== Spain ===
The oldest documents demonstrating the existence of organized whaling on the Iberian Peninsula date back to 1026, in the Basque Country. This activity, focused on right whales and carried out from the shore using rowboats and hand-thrown harpoons, continued along the entire northern coast of the peninsula until the 19th century. The last whale caught was a right whale calf killed in Orio in 1901. During the 14th to 18th centuries, the Basques expanded the whaling industry throughout the North Atlantic, establishing seasonal bases in northern Norway, Iceland, and Newfoundland. At the beginning of the 20th century, when traditional whaling had already declined, Norwegian companies operated floating whaling stations and built land-based whaling facilities in Galicia and the Strait of Gibraltar. In this case, the main target was the fin whale, although they also caught many sperm whales and some blue whales. The catches were excessive, and the decline in exploited populations led to the cessation of operations in the 1930s. In 1940, several companies reopened factories in Galicia and the Gulf of Cádiz (Algeciras and Ceuta) and resumed hunting. As Spain remained outside the International Whale Council (IWC) until 1979, catches made up to that point were not subject to any regulation, which meant that the last blue whales caught worldwide were killed in Galicia in 1978. The factories in the Gulf of Cádiz closed in the 1950s, but those in Galicia remained operational until the moratorium came into effect in 1986.

=== United Kingdom ===
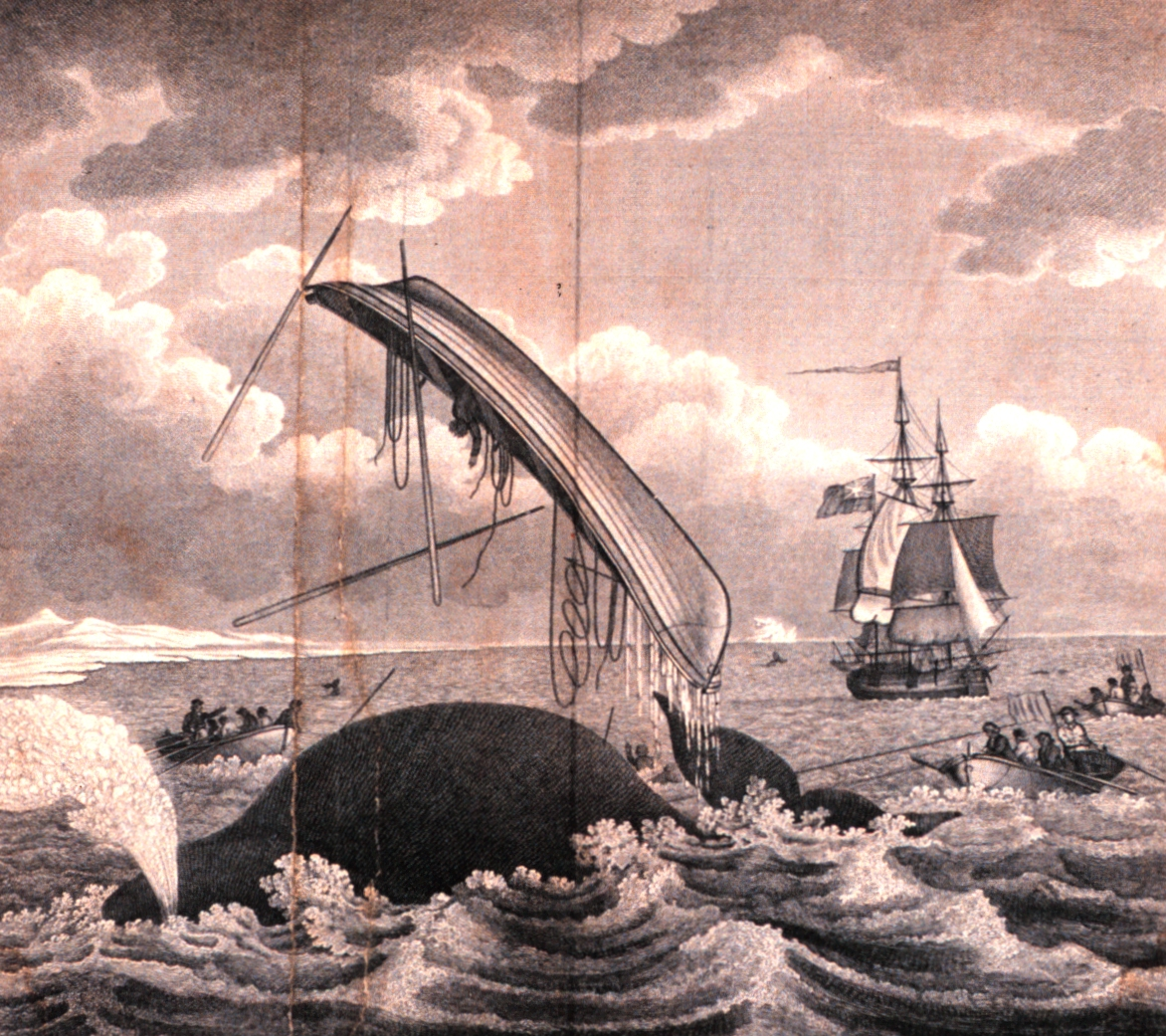
Dangers of the Whale Fishery, 1820. One whaleboat is up-ended, and another has a taut line, showing that the whale it harpooned may take the sailors on a Nantucket sleighride.

Commercial whaling in Great Britain began late in the 16th century and continued after the 1801 formation of the United Kingdom and intermittently until the middle of the 20th century.

The trade was broadly divided into two branches. The northern fishery involved hunting the bowhead whale off the coast of Greenland and adjacent islands. The southern fishery was activity anywhere else, including in the Atlantic, Pacific and Indian Oceans and off the Antarctic. The sperm whale, the southern right whale and humpback whale were the main target species in South Sea whaling. The industry went on to become a profitable national enterprise and a source of skilled mariners for the Royal Navy in times of war.

Modern whaling, using factory ships and catchers fitted with bow-mounted cannons that fired explosive harpoons, continued into the 20th century and was mainly focused on the Antarctic and nearby islands where shore stations had been established. The collapse of whale stocks in the 1960s, due to overfishing, saw the UK abandon the industry after three and a half centuries of involvement.

=== United States ===
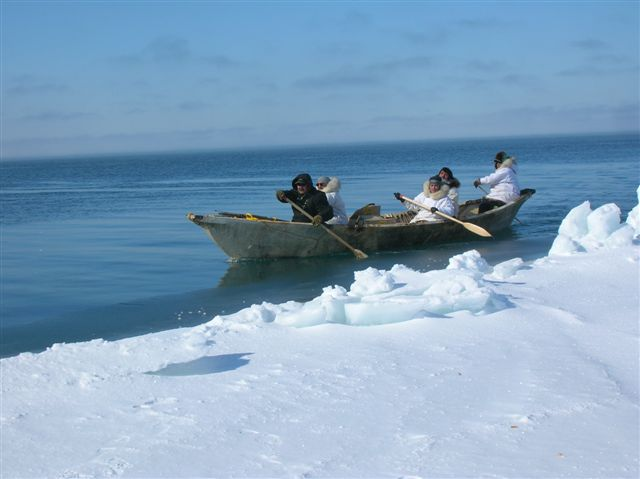
A traditional whaling crew in Alaska

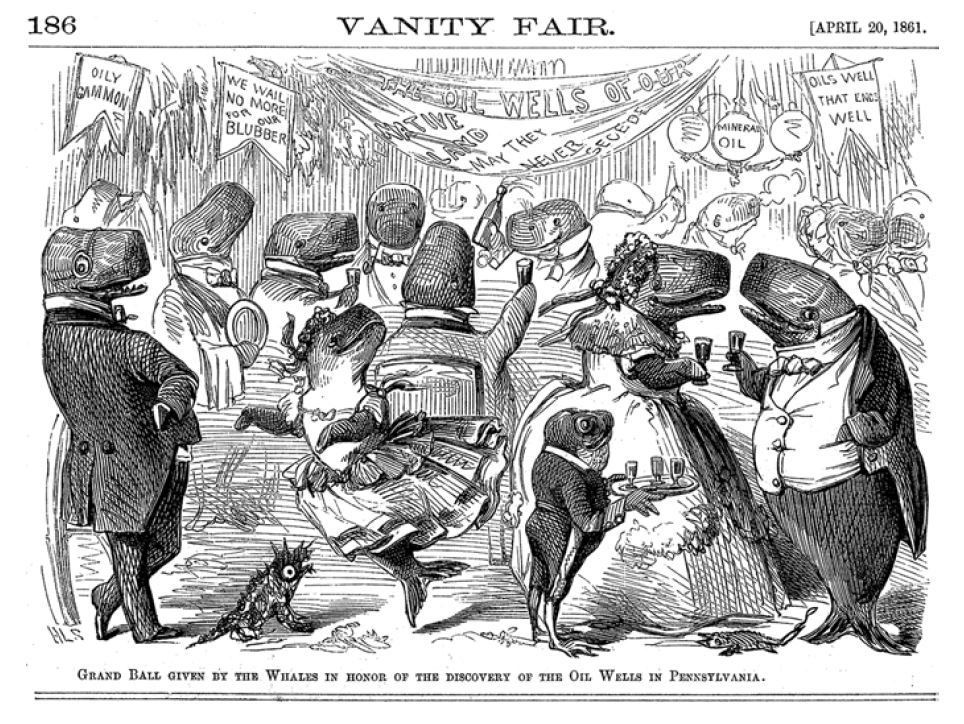
Whales party upon newly discovered oil in Pennsylvania in Vanity Fair magazine on April 20, 1861

In the United States, beluga whaling is widely carried out, catching about 300 belugas per year, monitored by the Alaska Beluga Whale Committee. The annual catch ranges between 250 and 600 per year.

Subsistence hunting of the bowhead whale is carried out by nine different indigenous Alaskan communities, and is managed by the Alaska Eskimo Whaling Commission which reports to the National Oceanic and Atmospheric Administration. The hunt takes around 50 bowhead whales a year from a population of about 10,500 in Alaskan waters. Conservationists fear this hunt is not sustainable, though the IWC Scientific Committee, the same group that provided the above population estimate, projects a population growth of 3.2% per year. The hunt also took an average of one or two gray whales each year until 1996. The quota was reduced to zero in that year due to sustainability concerns. A future review may result in the gray whale hunt being resumed.

The Makah tribe in Washington state also reinstated whaling in 1999, despite protests from animal rights groups. They are currently seeking to resume whaling of the gray whale, a right recognized in the Treaty of Neah Bay, within limits (Article 4 of the Treaty).

Season	Catch
2003	48
2004	43
2005	68
2006	39
2007	63
All catches in 2003–2007 were bowhead whales.

== See also ==
- Harpoon
- Flensing, processing of caught whales
- Sperm whaling
- Dolphin drive hunting
