= USS Nantucket =

USS Nantucket may refer to one of the following ships of the United States Navy:

- USS Nantucket (1862) – a Passaic-class coastal monitor that served in the Union during the American Civil War
- USS Nantucket (IX-18) – started off as Ranger when laid down in 1873, then renamed to Rockport before being named Nantucket
- USS Nantucket (LCS-27) – a Freedom-class littoral combat ship commissioned in 2024

== See also ==
- List of ships named Nantucket
- Nantucket (disambiguation)
