= The Unreleased "D.C. Tapes" =

Compilation album by Nantucket
- Released: 2006
- Genre: Hard rock
- Length: 33:28
- Label: Zella

Nantucket chronology
Still Live after All These Years (1995)	The Unreleased "D.C. Tapes" (2006)

The Unreleased "D.C. Tapes" is the latest release by North Carolina music group, Nantucket. It's a compilation album which features eight never before released songs taken from demo tapes recorded in the 1980s, including a second version of their 1979 single "California". The album was issued through the band's own label, Zella Records.

== Track listing ==
1. What Comes Around Goes Around - 3:42
2. Blind Driver - 3:39
3. California [New Version] - 4:27
4. Just Lookin' at You - 3:41
5. You and I - 3:45
6. Nights on Fire - 4:12
7. Continental Lady - 4:35
8. All Night Long - 5:25
