= Nantucket (band) =

American Southern rock band

- Origin: Jacksonville, North Carolina
- Genres: Rock music, Hard rock
- Years active: 1969-1990, 1993-present
- Labels: Epic, RCA, Executive Records
- Members: Larry Uzzell; Tommy Redd; Eddie Blair; Pee Wee Watson; Walter Garland; Jason Patterson
- Past members: Mike Uzzell Mark Downing: Kenny Soule; Richard Gates; David "Thumbs" Johnson; Alan Thornton; Rob "Kid Blister" Green; Chris Cash; Benny Dellinger; Perry Richardson; Ronnie Waters; Durwood Martin
- Website: www.nantucketband.com/epk.html

Nantucket is a rock band formed in Jacksonville, North Carolina in 1969. The group's original six members were Tommy Redd, Larry Uzzell, Mike Uzzell, Eddie Blair, Kenny Soule, and Mark Downing. The band signed with Epic Records in 1977 and RCA Records in 1983, releasing six albums before disbanding in 1990. The band reformed in 1993, recording a live album and playing with various lineups.

== Background ==
Jacksonville High School students Larry Uzzell, Mike Uzzell, and Tommy Redd formed as a soul and rhythm and blues cover band named Stax of Gold in Jacksonville, North Carolina in 1969. It later changed its name to Nantucket Sleighride following a name contest in 1972, which was shortened to Nantucket. Eddie Blair, Kenny Soule, and Mark Downing joined the band in the early 1970s. Nantucket became known in North Carolina as a cover band, playing "funky boogie, rock and roll, soul, folk rock, or oldies but goodies..." As the band began introducing its original material, it opened for Dr. Hook, Kiss, Stories, and Wild Cherry.

Nantucket signed with Epic Records in 1977. It released its self-titled album in 1978, which sold approximately 200,000 copies and also appeared on the Billboard charts. It featured the single "Heartbreaker" that went to number 62 on the Billboard Hot 100. In 1979, Nantucket followed up with Your Face or Mine?. Nantucket toured the United States as the opening act for Aerosmith, The Allman Brothers Band, Boston, The Cars, Cheap Trick, The Doobie Brothers, Foreigner, Journey, REO Speedwagon, and Styx.

Mike Uzzell was dismissed from the band by the third album, with Pee Wee Watson replacing him on bass guitar. As a tribute to AC/DC lead singer Bon Scott, who died in 1980, Nantucket's Long Way to the Top included a version of the 1975 classic "It’s a Long Way to the Top (If You Wanna Rock 'N' Roll)". The move landed the band a spot with AC/DC on its Back in Black tour for the summer of 1980.

Even though Nantucket found some success, Epic Records eventually dropped the band. Drummer Kenny Soule and bassist Pee Wee Watson left in 1981, joining guitarist Michael Gardner to form the rock trio PKM. They were replaced by Richard Gates and David "Thumbs" Johnson. The band signed with RCA and released No Direction Home in 1983.

After Nantucket split with RCA, Mike Uzzell became the band's manager and formed the independent label, Executive Records, in 1985. In 1988, Larry Uzzell was the band's only remaining original member. The band released Nantucket V on Executive Records in 1985, with additional guitarist Alan Thornton. Nantucket disbanded in 1990.

The original members of Nantucket reunited in 1993 and recorded a live session, released as Still Live after All These Years in 1995. It featured earlier songs and new material. The band occasionally played nightclubs in the Carolinas while continuing its side projects. In 2005, it released The Unreleased "D.C. Tapes" with eight new songs.

The band's first three studio albums were released on compact disc by reissue label Wounded Bird Records in 2003 and 2004. Nantucket V was made available on CD through reissue label Retrospect Records in 2007. No Direction Home was made available on CD through reissue label American Beat Records in 2009. Nantucket released the CD You Need a Ride to Raleigh in 2011. Its track, "You Need a Ride to Raleigh", was nominated for a Carolina Beach Music Award in 2013.

Mike Uzzell played his last show in April 2015 after being dismissed from the band again. For an interim period, he was replaced with Durwood Martin. Pee Wee Watson eventually returned as the full-time bass player, rejoining the band in February 2016. In 2014, musician John Wilson began making a documentary about Nantucket. For the film, the band's original lineup had a reunion.

== Awards and honors ==
Nantucket received a Lifetime Achievement Award from the Charlotte Music Awards in 2009. It was inducted into the North Carolina Music Hall of Fame on October 11, 2012.

== Band members ==
- Larry Uzzell: lead and background vocals, bass guitar, trumpet, harp, congas, percussion, harmonica (1969–1990, 1991 )
- Tommy Redd: songwriter, lead & rhythm guitars, acoustic guitar, spoon, lead and background vocals (1969–1980s, 1991)
- Eddie Blair: tenor and soprano saxophones, keyboards, piano, organ, clavinet, percussion, background vocals (1970s–1980s, 1991)
- Pee Wee Watson: bass guitar, vocals (1979–1980; February 2016)
- Walter Garland: lead guitar
- Jason Patterson: drums and percussion, background vocals

=== Former ===
- Mike Uzzell: Moog bass, synthesizer, Hammond B-3 organ, lead and background vocals (1969–1979; 1993– April 2015)
- Mark Downing: lead, slide, rhythm, and acoustic guitars; 12-string guitar; pedal guitar (1970s–1981, 1993–)
- Kenny Soule: drums and percussion, timpani, background vocals (1970s–1981, 1993)
- Richard Gates: drums, Oberheim DMX drum machine (1981–1990)
- David "Thumbs" Johnson: bass guitar, Oberheim DMX drum machine, background vocals (1981–1990)
- Alan Thornton: lead and rhythm guitars, Z-28 (1985–1990)
- Rob "Kid Blister" Green: lead guitar and background vocals (1986–1988)
- Chris Cash: lead guitar and background vocals (1988–1990)
- Benny Dellinger: lead guitar and background vocals (1994–2011)
- Perry Richardson: bass guitar and background vocals
- Ronnie Waters: lead guitar, vocals
- Durwood Martin: keyboard bass (2015– )

== Discography ==
=== Albums ===
- Nantucket (1978)
- Your Face or Mine? (1979)
- Long Way to the Top (#206) (1980)
- No Direction Home (1983)
- Nantucket V (1984)
- The Best of Nantucket (1986)
- Still Live after All These Years (1995)
- The Unreleased "D.C. Tapes" (2005)
- You Need a Ride to Raleigh (2011)

=== Singles ===
- "Heartbreaker"/ "She's No Good" (1977)
- "Quite Like You"/"Girl, You Blew a Good Thing" (1978)
- "Put Out or Get Out"/"Gimme Your Love" (1979)
- "Hiding from Love" (1983)
