= Your Face or Mine? (album) =

Studio album by Nantucket
- Released: 1979
- Recorded: 1978
- Genre: Hard rock
- Length: 35:57
- Label: Epic
- Producer: Tony Reale & Nantucket

Nantucket chronology
Nantucket (1978)	Your Face or Mine? (1979)	Long Way to the Top (1980)

Professional ratings
Review scores
Source	Rating
Allmusic	4/5 stars

Your Face or Mine? is the second release by North Carolina music group, Nantucket. Although considered the better album of the two, its sales paled in comparison to those of its self-titled predecessor. Featured songs include "Gimme Your Love" and "California". Your Face or Mine? was released on compact disc by re-issue label Wounded Bird Records in 2004.

== Track listing ==
1. Gimme Your Love (Redd) – 4:15
2. I Live For Your Love (Redd) – 3:06
3. Hey, Hey Blondie (Redd) – 3:39
4. California (Redd) – 4:11
5. Wide Awake (Redd) - 3:30
6. Don't Hang Up (Redd) - 4:13
7. Your Place or Mine (Redd) - 3:35
8. Just the Devil's Way (Redd) - 4:10
9. Is It Wrong To Rock And Roll (Redd) - 5:18

== Personnel ==
- Tommy Redd: Lead & Rhythm Guitars, Spoon, Lead & Background Vocals
- Larry Uzzell: Lead & Background Vocals, Bass Guitar, Percussion
- Mike Uzzell: Organ, Moog Bass & Synthesizer, Piano, Lead & Background Vocals
- Mark Downing: Lead, Rhythm & Slide Guitars, 12-String Guitar, Pedal Guitar, Background Vocals
- Eddie Blair: Tenor & Soprano Saxophones, Piano, Organ, Clavinet, Background Vocals
- Kenny Soule: Drums, Tympani, Background Vocals
