= Nantucket V =

Studio album by Nantucket
- Released: 1984
- Recorded: 1984
- Genre: Rock
- Length: 32:59
- Label: Executive
- Producer: Mike Uzzell & Rod Dash

Nantucket chronology
No Direction Home (1983)	Nantucket V (1984)	The Best of Nantucket (1986)

Nantucket V is the fifth release and last studio album by North Carolina music group, Nantucket. A less hard rock sounding work produced through Raleigh, North Carolina label Executive Records (now defunct), it features the songs "Pretty Legs" and "Looking You Up". Nantucket V was made available on compact disc through re-issue label Retrospect Records in 2007.

== Track listing ==
1. Pretty Legs (Redd/Blair/Johnson) – 3:34
2. Ain't It a Shame (Redd) – 3:21
3. Made for You (Thornton) – 4:02
4. Looking You Up (Redd/Downing) – 3:59
5. Drivin' Me Crazy (Johnson/Uzzell/Redd) - 3:21
6. Out of Control (Johnson/Gates) - 1:05
7. Can't Stop Rockin' (Redd) - 3:00
8. Horizontal Weekend (Redd) - 3:11
9. Freedom (Thornton) - 3:49
10. Party'n in the Cars (Redd/Thornton/Johnson/Gates) - 3:37

== Personnel ==
- Larry Uzzell: Lead & Background Vocals, Harmonica, Percussion
- Tommy Redd: Rhythm Guitar, Background Vocals
- Eddie Blair: Saxophones, Keyboards, Background Vocals
- David "Thumbs" Johnson: Bass Guitar, Oberheim DX Drum Machine, Background Vocals
- Richard Gates: Drums, Percussion, Oberheim DX Drum Machine, Simmons Drums
- Alan Thornton: Lead & Rhythm Guitar, Z-28
