= Harpoon cannon =

Whaling implement

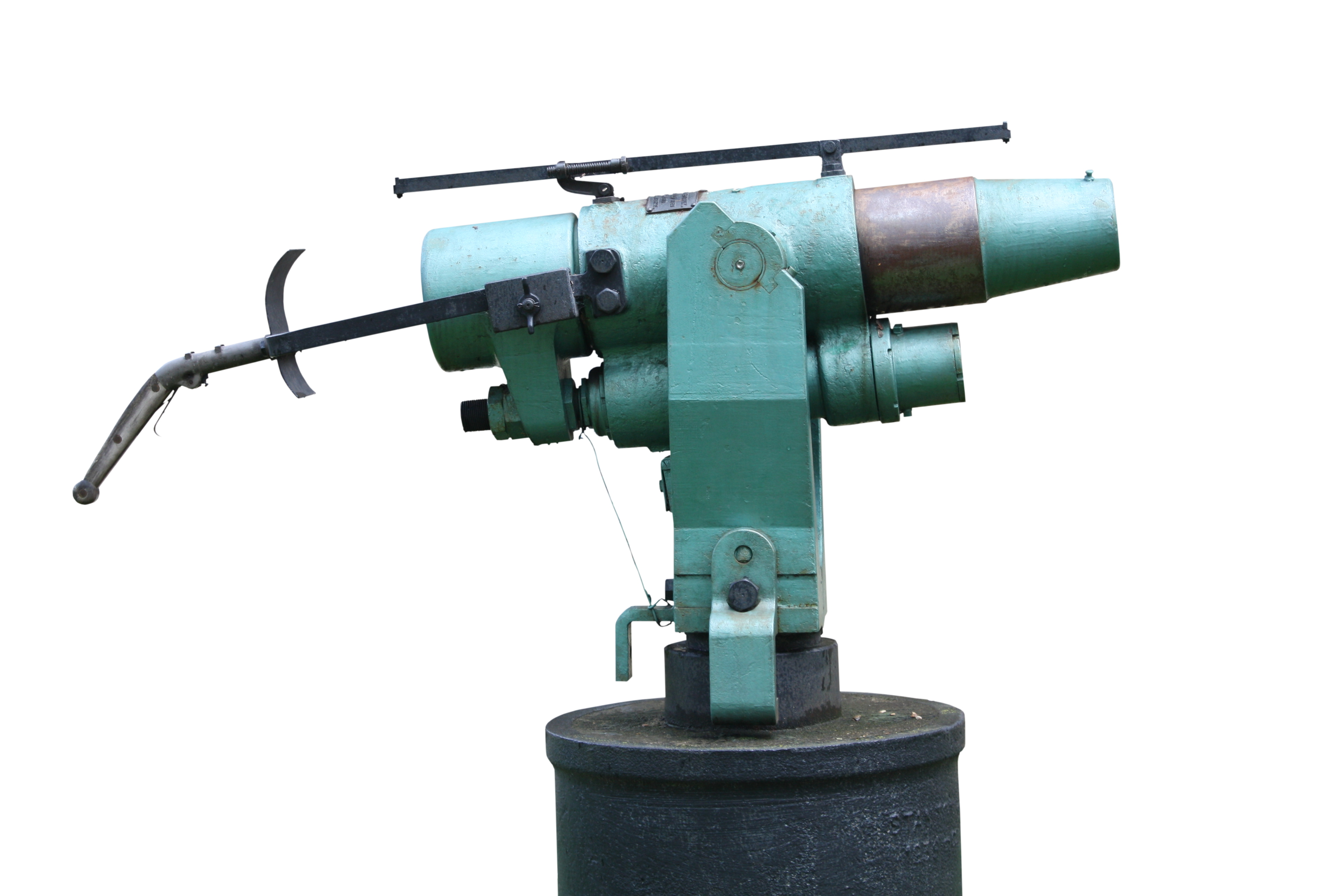
Harpoon cannon outside of the Scott Polar Research Institute in Cambridge.

A harpoon cannon is a whaling implement developed in the late 19th century and most used in the 20th century. It would be mounted on the bow of a whale catcher, where it could be easily aimed with a wide field of view at the target. Powered by black powder and later, smokeless powder, it would generally fire a large steel harpoon, either solid steel (cold harpoon) or fitted with an exploding black powder, or later, penthrite (PETN) grenade.

Harpoon cannons are still used by whaling nations, but these are usually guns of a smaller caliber. The exception is Iceland, which hunts large whales regularly.

== History ==
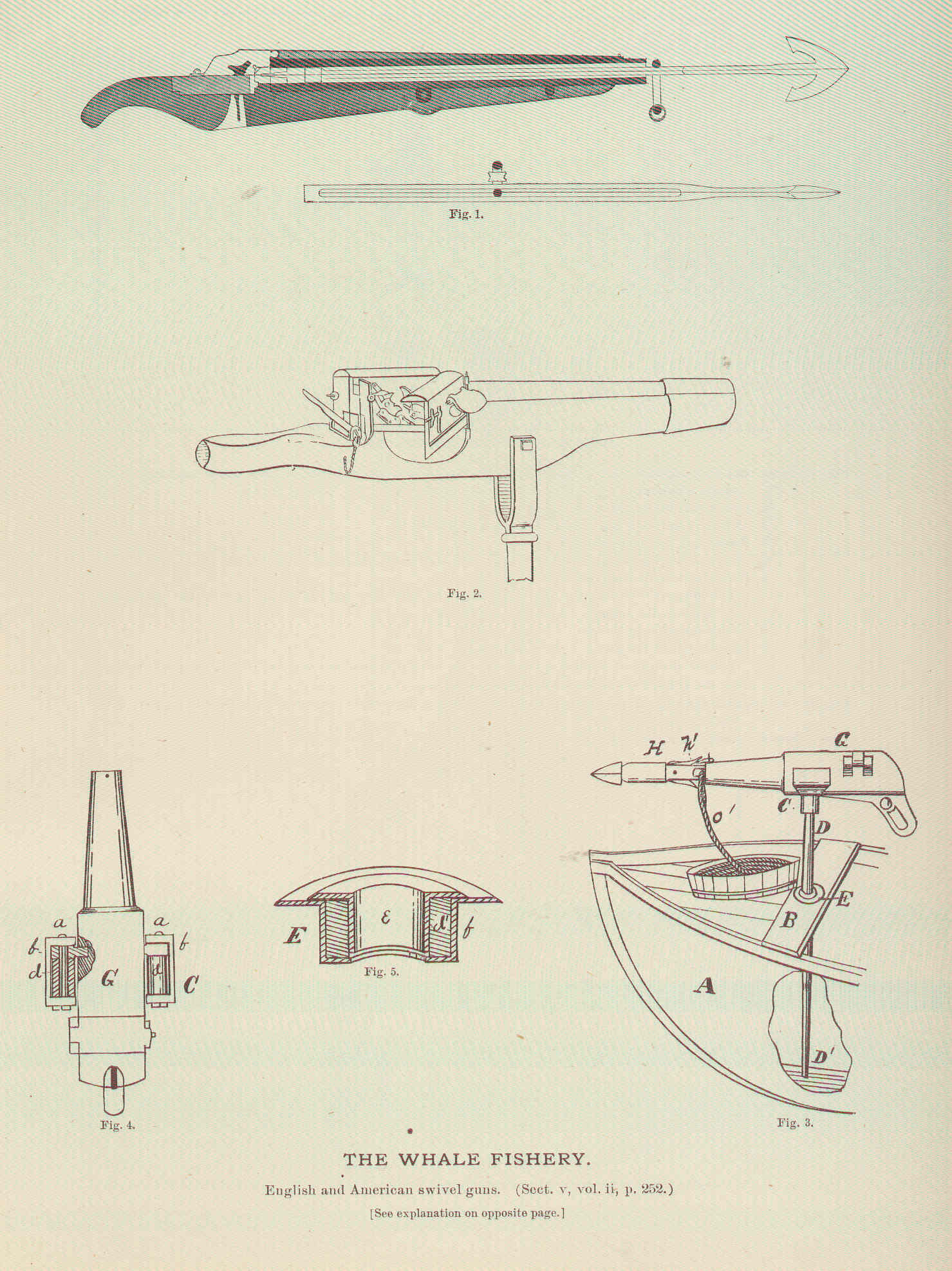
English and American harpoon gun.

Early engineers attempted to develop gun-fired harpoons to improve the hit rate from hand-thrown harpoons, generally with little success, as the guns were not very accurate, especially when fired from small moving whaleboats. Another problem appeared when the quarry were baleen whales, which tended to sink when killed. The idea was modernized and perfected by Norwegian Svend Foyn. He developed a swiveling steel cannon, mounted to the bow deck of his steel and steam whaling ship, improving accuracy, and lastly, attaching an exploding steel head to the harpoon, filled with 500 grams (18 oz) of black powder. While by no means instantaneous, the whale's death would be faster than before, and there would be greater ease in keeping the whale attached to the harpoon line. Modern guns with improved grenades were significantly improved during the 20th century, and currently, the most advanced technologies can kill a whale virtually instantly.

== Design ==
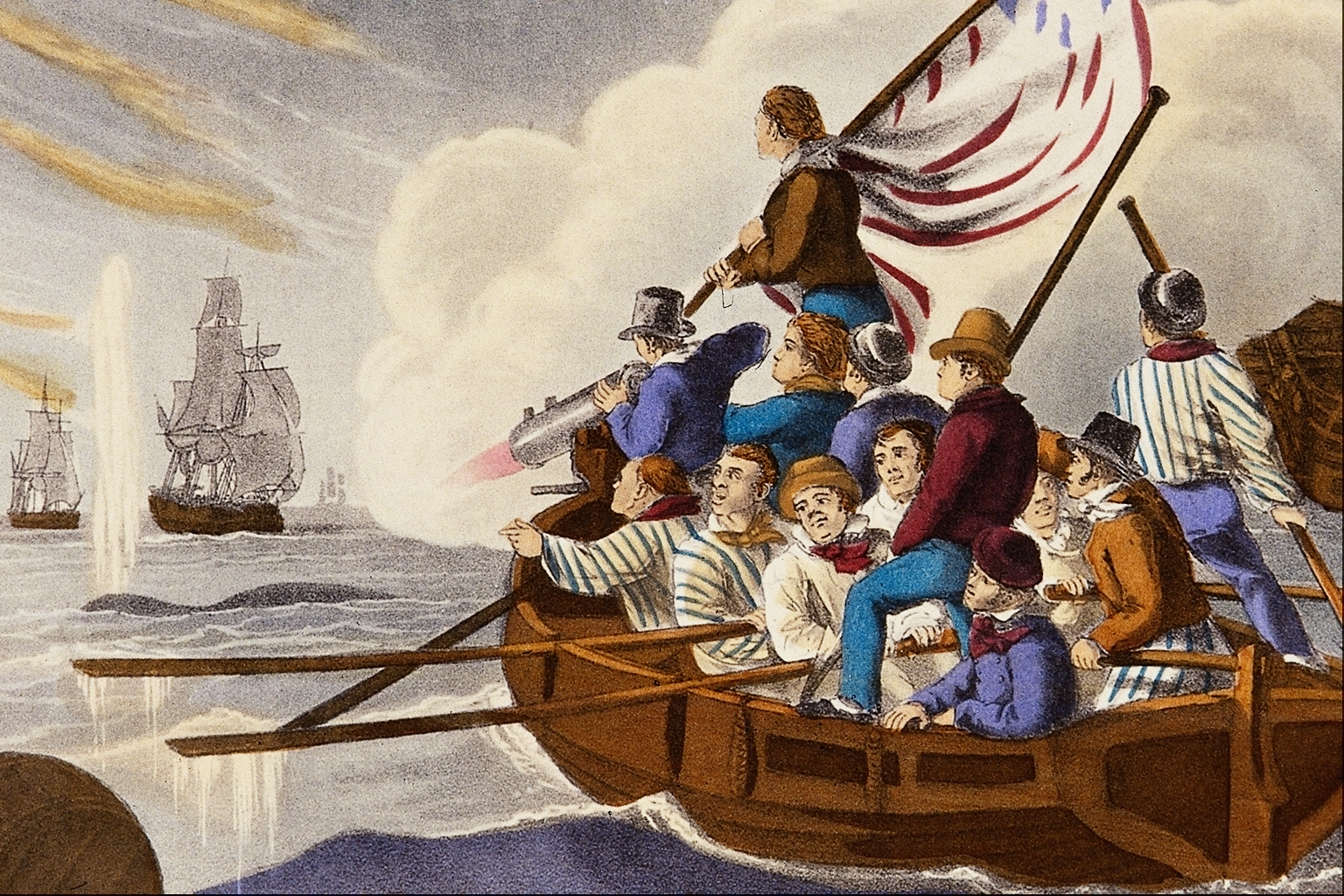
Shooting a harpoon at a whale

Early cannons were muzzle-loading, but were replaced later with breech-loading models. These are used in modern whaling, with the exception of many Norwegian cannons which utilize an improved muzzle-loading design, with a breech firing system. In the early 20th century, almost all cannons were similar to the Kongsberg 90 mm design. With a trigger mounted on the back of a steel handle which would lever a thin rod up to the firing device in the horizontally sliding breechblock. To load, the rear cover plate would be rotated, exposing the back of the rectangular breechblock. The breechblock would be opened by rotating a handle on the top of the breech, and the spent cartridge case removed, to be reloaded with powder and wadding. A new cartridge would be prepared and slid up into the firing chamber, the breechblock would be closed by rotating the handle counterclockwise, the rear cover would be rotated back to cover the rear chamber, a harpoon would be prepared, inserted into the muzzle, and tied on. Then another rotating handle on the side of the breechblock would be pulled back to cock the firing pin. This handle was directly adjacent to the firing trigger on the block. The gun was solid steel, and had a glycerin recoil cylinder mounted under the barrel. The inner barrel and breech would bounce back on the recoil, while the handle and swivel in the deck would be mounted on a stationary outer cylinder.

== 21st century ==
Iceland uses 90 mm cannons built by Kongsberg Våpenfabrikk (KV) in the fin whale hunt by Hvalur hf. It also uses 50 mm cannons built by KV in the minke whale hunt. Norway uses 50 mm KV cannons in the minke whale hunt, as well as muzzle-loading 60 mm Henriksen cannons. Greenland uses 50 mm KV cannons in the hunt for minke, bowhead, fin, and humpback whales. Japan uses 75 mm cannons, built by Miroku Manufacturing in its pelagic whaling in the North Pacific and Antarctic research hunts.

All of the above countries utilize Norwegian-designed PETN grenades to improve the humaneness of the kill, with the exception of Japan, which uses domestically manufactured grenades, which have proved less effective at guaranteeing an instant kill (40% instant death rate in Japan vs. 80% in Norway).
