= No Direction Home (album) =

Studio album by Nantucket
- Released: 1983
- Recorded: 1982
- Genre: Hard rock
- Length: 40:05
- Label: RCA
- Producer: Mike Flicker

Nantucket chronology
| Long Way to the Top (1980) | No Direction Home (1983) | Nantucket V (1985) |

No Direction Home is the fourth release by North Carolina music group, Nantucket. Richard Gates and David "Thumbs" Johnson replaced drummer Kenny Soule and bassist Pee Wee Watson for this album, who both left the band in 1981 and joined guitarist Michael Gardner to form rock trio PKM. Featured singles include "Tennessee Whiskey," a version of the Bryan Adams song "Hiding From Love" and a version of the Marvin Gaye #1 hit classic "Ain't That Particular".

== Track listing ==
1. No Direction Home (Redd) – 4:18
2. I Don't Want to Lose You (Redd/Uzzell) – 5:41
3. Hiding from Love (Adams/Vallance/Kagna) – 3:25
4. Ain't That Peculiar (Robinson/Moore/Tarplin/Rogers) – 3:25
5. Morning, Noon and Night (Redd) - 3:17
6. Ready for Your Love (Redd) - 3:50
7. Come Home Darling (Redd/Uzzell) - 4:11
8. Never Felt This Way Before (Redd) - 4:21
9. Girl I've Got Your Number (Redd) - 4:02
10. Tennessee Whiskey (Redd) - 3:35

== Personnel ==
- Larry Uzzell: Lead & Background Vocals
- Tommy Redd: Guitar, Background Vocals
- Eddie Blair: Keyboards, Saxophone, Background Vocals
- Mark Downing: Guitar
- Richard Gates: Drums
- David "Thumbs" Johnson: Bass Guitar, Background Vocals

== See also ==
- List of songs written by Bob Dylan
- List of artists who have covered Bob Dylan songs
