= Long Way to the Top (album) =

Studio album by Nantucket
- Released: 1980
- Recorded: 1979
- Genre: Hard rock
- Length: 43:52
- Label: Epic
- Producer: Tom Allom

Nantucket chronology
Your Face or Mine? (1979)	Long Way to the Top (1980)	No Direction Home (1983)

Professional ratings
Review scores
Source	Rating
Allmusic	Link

Long Way to the Top is the third release by North Carolina music group, Nantucket. The album is a tribute to AC/DC lead singer Bon Scott, who died in 1980 and features a version of their 1975 classic "It's a Long Way to the Top (If You Wanna Rock 'N' Roll)". This move landed Nantucket a spot with AC/DC on their Back in Black tour for the entire summer. Other popular songs on the album include "Time Bomb", "Rugburn" and "Turn The Radio On". Long Way to the Top was released on compact disc by re-issue label Wounded Bird Records in 2004.

== Track listing ==
1. "It's a Long Way to the Top" (Young/Scott/Young) – 4:20
2. "Living With You" (Redd) – 2:21
3. "Time Bomb" (Redd) – 2:59
4. "50 More" (Redd) – 5:21
5. "Media Darlin'" (Redd) - 3:28
6. "Rugburn" (Redd/Soule) - 3:28
7. "Too Much Wrong in the Past (For a Future)" (Redd/Soule/Uzzell/Downing) - 4:06
8. "Over and Over Again" (Redd/Soule/Uzzell/Uzzell/Blair) - 2:48
9. "Turn the Radio On" (Redd) - 3:02
10. "Tell Me (Doctor Rhythm Method) (Redd) - 2:40
11. "Rescue" (Redd/Soule/Uzzell/Downing/Uzzell/Blair) - 4:45
12. "Rock of the 80's" (Redd) - 4:34

== Personnel ==
- Larry Uzzell: Lead Vocals
- Tommy Redd: Guitars, Vocals
- Mark Downing: Lead Guitar
- Eddie Blair: Sax, Keyboards, Vocals
- Kenny Soule: Drums
- Pee Wee Watson: Bass, Vocals
