= Nantucket (album) =

Studio album by Nantucket
- Released: 1978
- Recorded: 1977
- Genre: Hard rock
- Length: 36:20
- Label: Epic
- Producer: Win Kutz

Nantucket chronology
Nantucket (1978)	Your Face or Mine? (1979)

Nantucket is the debut release by North Carolina music group, Nantucket. It includes the hit single "Heartbreaker", which helped this album make the Billboard charts and sell around 200,000 copies. Other featured songs include "She's No Good", "Born in a Honky Tonk", "Girl, You Blew a Good Thing" and "Quite Like You". Norton Buffalo from the Steve Miller Band has a harp (harmonica) solo on the song "Never Gonna Take Your Lies". Nantucket was released on compact disc by re-issue label Wounded Bird Records in 2003.

== Track listing ==
1. "Heartbreaker" (Redd) – 3:53
2. "Never Gonna Take Your Lies" (Redd) – 3:49
3. "Real Romance" (Redd) – 4:08
4. "She's No Good" (Redd) – 3:27
5. "Born in a Honky Tonk" (Redd) – 3:21
6. "It's Gettin' Harder" (Redd) – 3:34
7. "Girl, You Blew a Good Thing" (Redd) – 3:30
8. "Spring Fever" (Redd) – 4:45
9. "Quite Like You" (Redd) – 2:29
10. "What's the Matter with Loving You" (Redd) – 3:24

== Personnel ==
- Tommy Redd – lead and rhythm guitars, acoustic guitar, lead and background vocals
- Larry Uzzell – lead and background vocals, bass guitar, trumpet, harp, congas, percussion
- Mike Uzzell – Moog bass, various keyboards, lead and background vocals
- Eddie Blair – saxophones, keyboards, percussion, background vocals
- Kenny Soule – drums and percussion
- Mark Downing – lead, slide and acoustic guitars

Additional musician

- Norton Buffalo – harp solo on "Never Gonna Take Your Lies"
