= Faroese cuisine =

Traditional food of the Faroe Islands

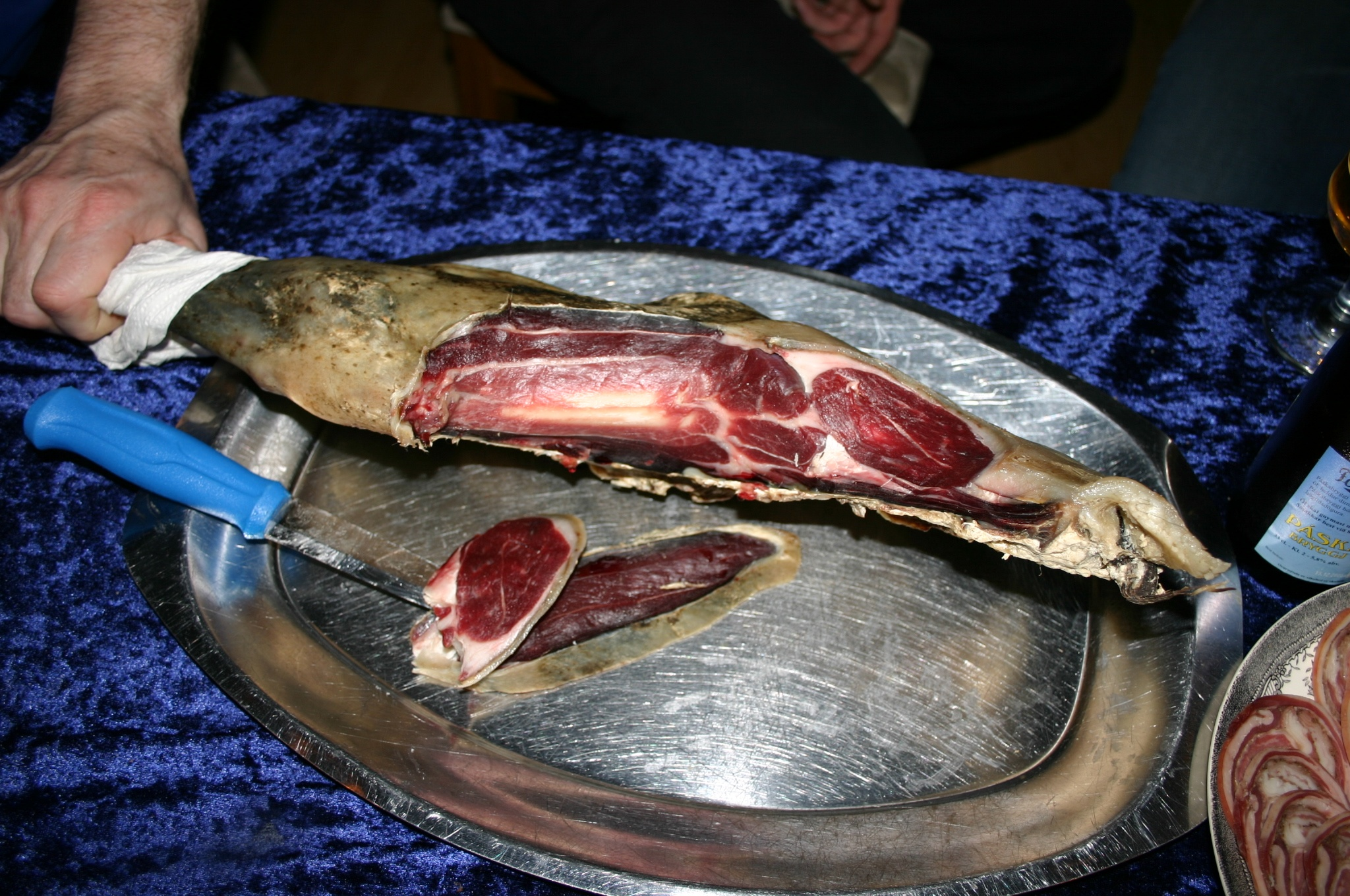
Skerpikjøt

Important parts of Faroese cuisine are lamb and also fish owing to proximity to the sea. Traditional foods from the Faroe Islands include skerpikjøt (a type of dried mutton), seafood, whale meat, blubber, garnatálg, Atlantic puffins, potatoes, and few fresh vegetables.

Much of the taste of this traditional country food is determined by the food preservation methods used; brine, drying, and the maturing of meat and fish, called ræstkjøt and ræstur fiskur.

Animal products dominate Faroese cuisine. Popular taste has developed, however, to become closer to the European norm, and consumption of vegetables has greatly increased in recent decades while consumption of fish has diminished. Fresh and ræst lamb meat remains very popular while traditional meat products, such as various types of sausages, have lost much of their appeal with younger generations.

== Types of food ==
=== Fish ===
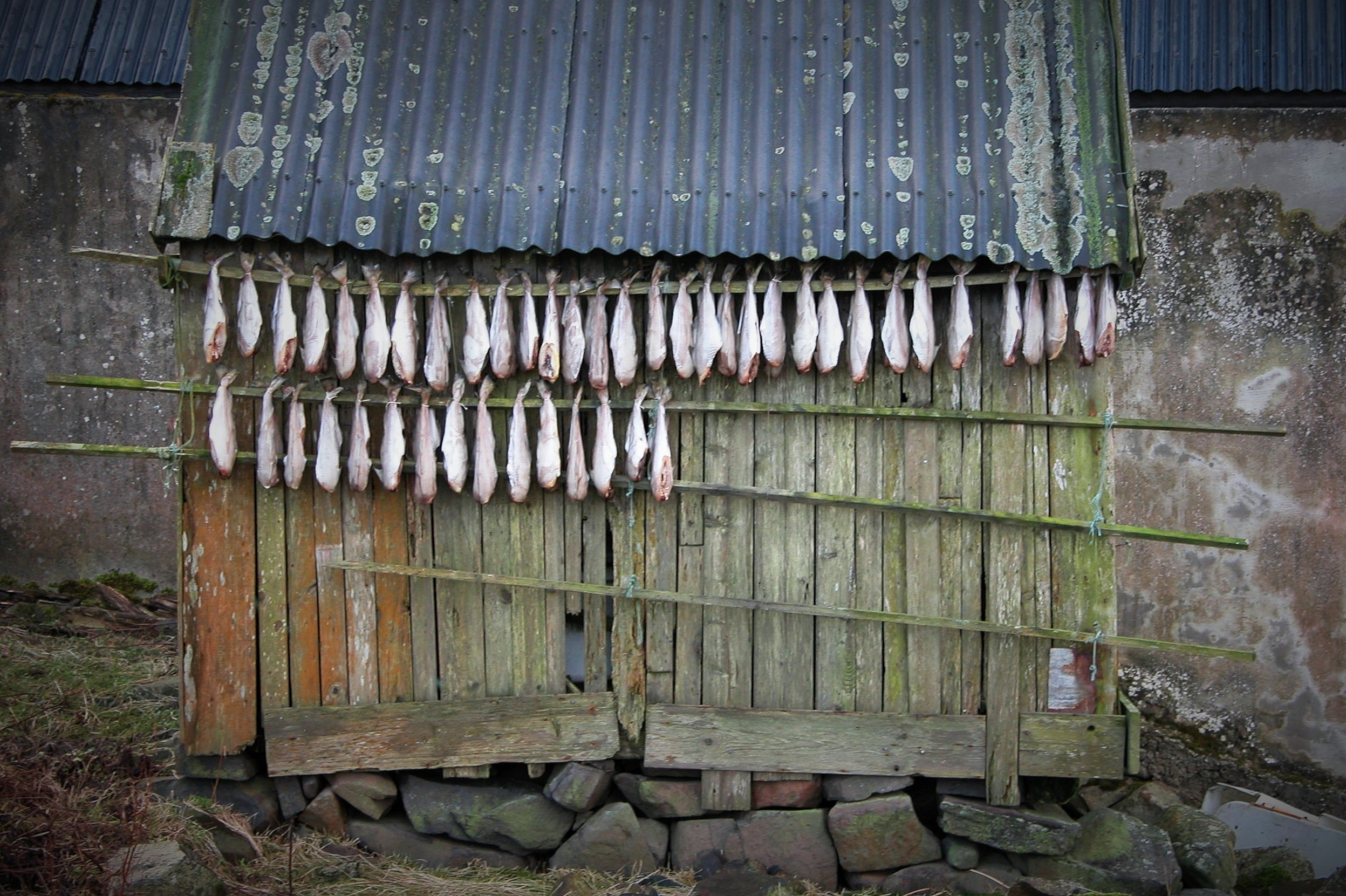
Faroese dry fish

Fish dishes in the Faroe Islands are caught in the waters of the North Atlantic Ocean. Fresh fish is eaten year-round. Islanders eat mostly haddock, plaice, halibut, herring, and shrimp.

=== Meat ===
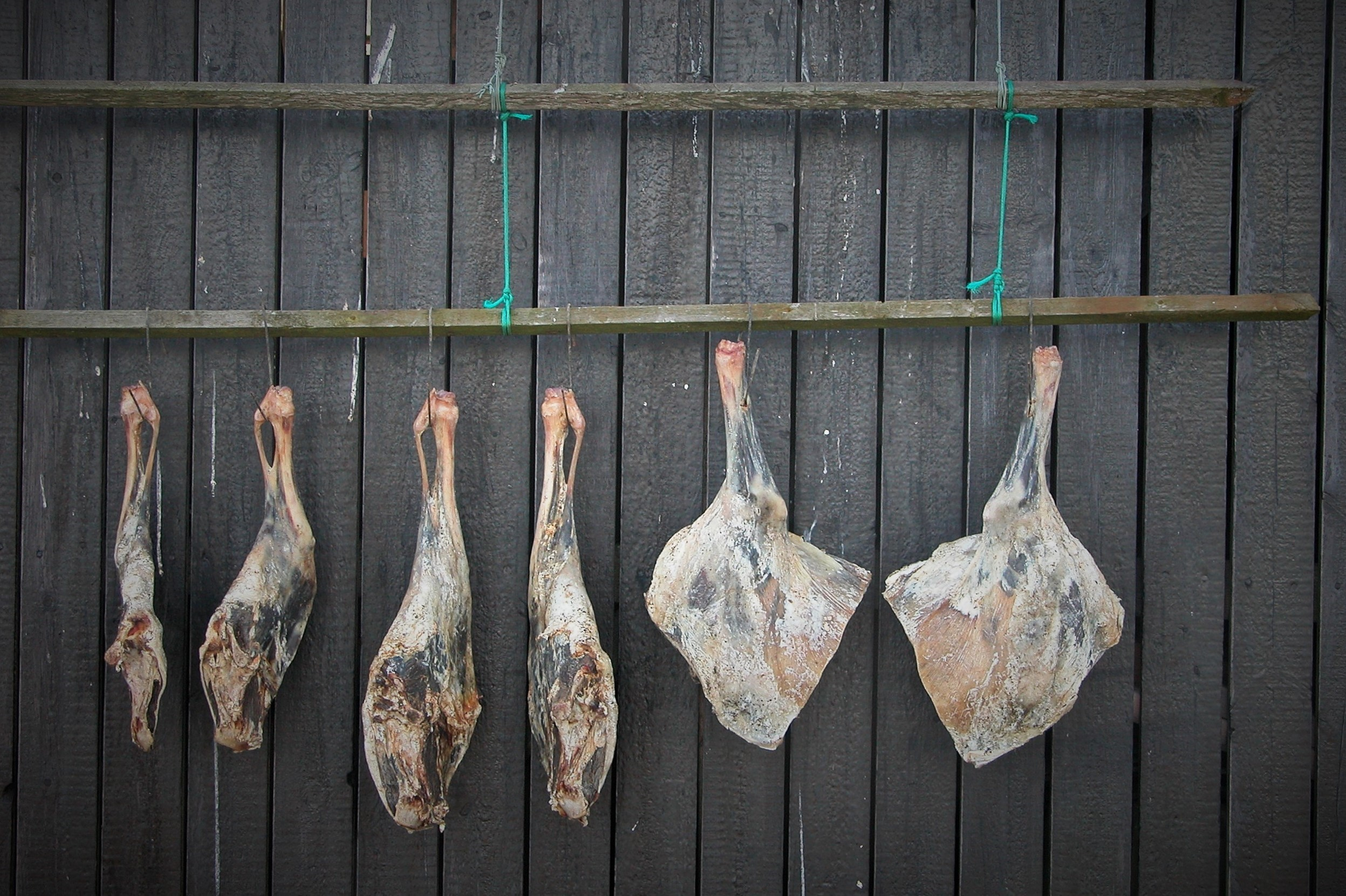
Ræstkjøt hanging outside a drying shed

Traditionally the main source of meat was the domestic sheep, the most common farm animal in the Faroe Islands. Sheep were also used for their wool. The most popular treat is skerpikjøt, well-aged, wind-dried mutton. The drying shed, known as a hjallur, is a standard feature in many Faroese homes, particularly in the small towns and villages. Other traditional foods are ræst kjøt (semi-dried mutton) and ræstur fiskur, matured fish.

=== Game ===
Small game in the Faroe Islands consists mostly of seabirds.

=== Whale meat and blubber ===
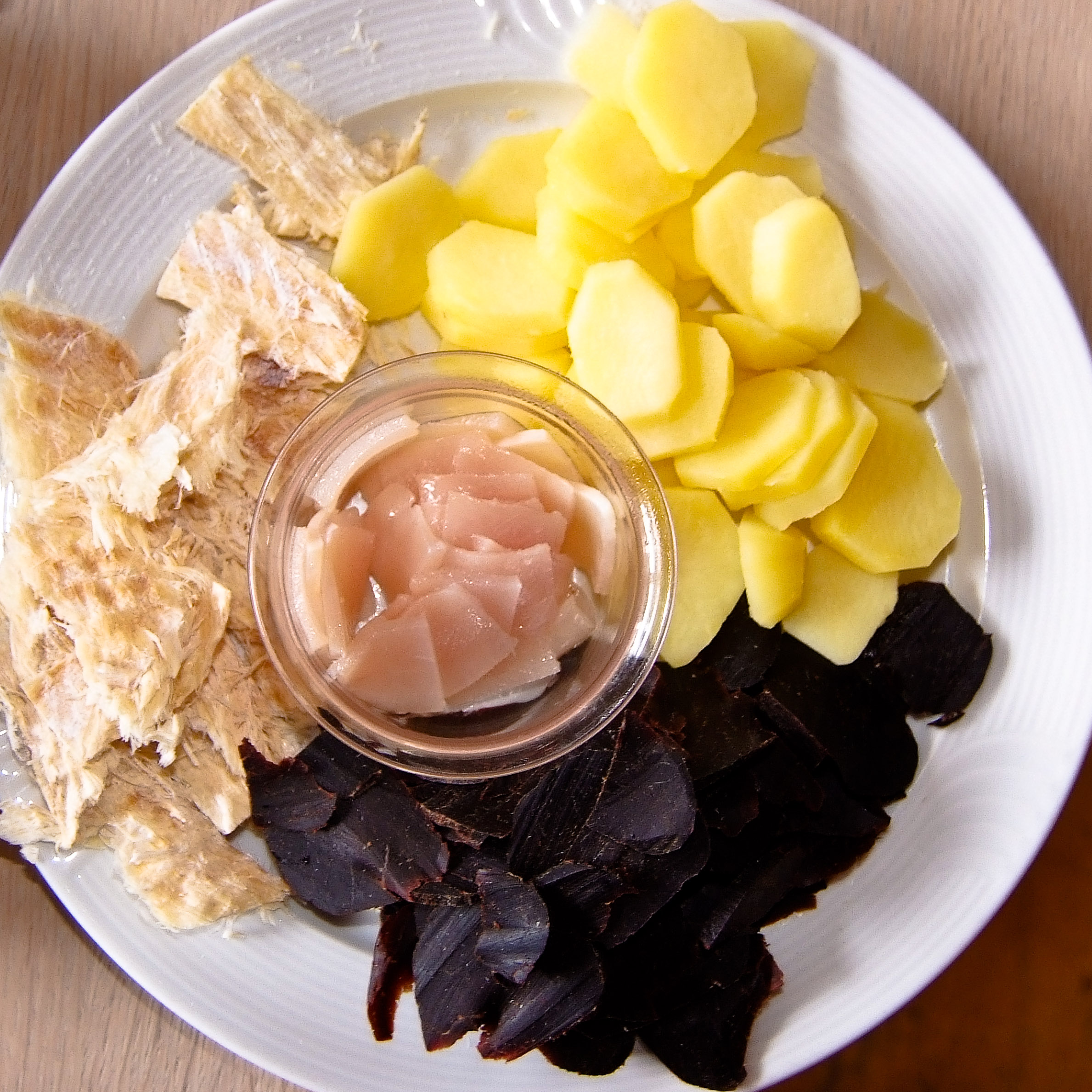
Traditional dish consisting of dried pilot whale meat (the black meat), blubber (in the center) which has been brined, cooked cold potatoes, and dried fish

Another Faroese specialty is tvøst og spik, pilot whale meat, and blubber. The meat and the blubber can be preserved and prepared in different ways. Often it is cut into long thin slices, which are called likkja (grindalikkja) in singular form, and likkjur (grindalikkjur) in plural, both hung up to dry. These are often served as part of the so-called kalt borð (cold table), a platter (similar to a Greek meze or antipasti in Italy) served with a variety of cold Faroese and various foreign-influenced foods. The Faroese dishes can consist of pilot whale meat and blubber, dried fish, and dried lamb meat (skerpikjøt). The kalda borðið (another term for ‘cold table’) is used for festive occasions. Pilot whale meat can also be boiled or, less traditionally, fried or served as steaks. There are also two ways of salting the whale meat, with dry salt or in salted briny water (saltlakað grind). Boiled potatoes are normally eaten together with the whale meat and the blubber, but this tradition is rather recent, as potatoes were not common in the Faroe Islands before sometime in the early to mid-19th century.

For several decades, the pilot whale population of the North Atlantic Ocean have accumulated toxins in their tissues due to pollution, with both Faroese and foreign scientists researching the levels of heavy metals, among other elements, in the whales and their potential effect on human health. The Department of Occupational Medicine and Public Health, with Dr. Pál Weihe and international scientists like (P. Grandjean), has conducted research for several years on the effect of mercury and polychlorinated biphenyl contamination of the pilot whales. Research, since 1977 in the Faroe Islands, has led to recommendations of abstaining from the consumption of pilot whale and blubber. Some years ago his advice was that Faroese people should not eat whale meat more than once a month at the most. He later changed his recommendations and, together with Høgni Debes Joensen, chief medical officer of the Faroes, said that he would not recommend whale meat or blubber for human consumption at all. However, the Faroese government has not forbidden the whale drives. The Heilsufrøðiliga Starvsstovan or "Faroese Food and Veterinary Agency" consulted foreign scientists and issued a new recommendation in 2011. They say that people can eat whale meat and blubber once a month at the most. At the same time they reported that the kidneys and the liver of the whale are so contaminated with mercury, PCB, and dioxin that they are not recommended for human consumption at all. They also recommend that women who wish to become pregnant should refrain from eating blubber, and that women who are pregnant or about to become pregnant should not eat whale meat either.

=== Beer ===
The oldest brewery in the Faroes is Föroya Bjór, which has produced beer since 1888, exporting mainly to Iceland and Denmark. It maintains its original location in Klaksvík.

The beer brewery Okkara was established in 2010, located in Velbastaður.

Hard alcohol like snaps was not allowed to be produced in the Faroe Islands until 2011, hence the Faroese aquavit, Aqua Vita, and other kind of alcoholic beverages like Eldvatn and Havið, made by the Faroese company DISM, were produced abroad. But in May 2011 the Faroese government made a new law which allowed Faroese breweries and distilleries to brew strong beer and make spirits.

DISM was established in 2008; the company is better known by the name of their first product, Lívsins Vatn.

=== Imported foods ===
Since the British occupation of the Faroe Islands, the Faroese have been fond of British food, in particular British-style chocolate such as Cadbury Dairy Milk, which is found in many of the islands' shops.

Even though there are twice as many sheep in the Faroe Islands as there are people, local fresh lamb meat is not usually available in the supermarkets. The only lamb meat which can be found in the supermarkets comes from Iceland or New Zealand. Most of the sheep belong to families, and they have only enough for themselves and do not sell it to others. Some farmers with larger stocks of sheep can be found around the islands, and they sell the meat privately to people in the Faroes, and to restaurants or supermarkets, but mostly the meat from these suppliers for the supermarkets is dried mutton, not fresh lamb meat.

There are no pigs in the Faroe Islands, but pork is quite popular, so it is imported, mostly from Denmark. Some farmers have cattle, but it is mainly dairy cattle. Veal is imported. Chicken and turkey are also imported. Most food in supermarkets is imported from other countries. Milk and yoghurt are produced in the Faroes, but cheese is imported. Fruit and vegetables are imported from various countries. Sometimes one can buy Faroese-grown potatoes and rutabaga. Eggs are imported from Denmark and Sweden. The Faroe Islands imported more than a half billion (526,603,000) DKK in 2011 of foods, beverages, and tobacco.

== See also ==
- Faroe Islands domestic animals
- Danish cuisine
