= Lucky Pierrot =

Japanese fast food restaurant chain

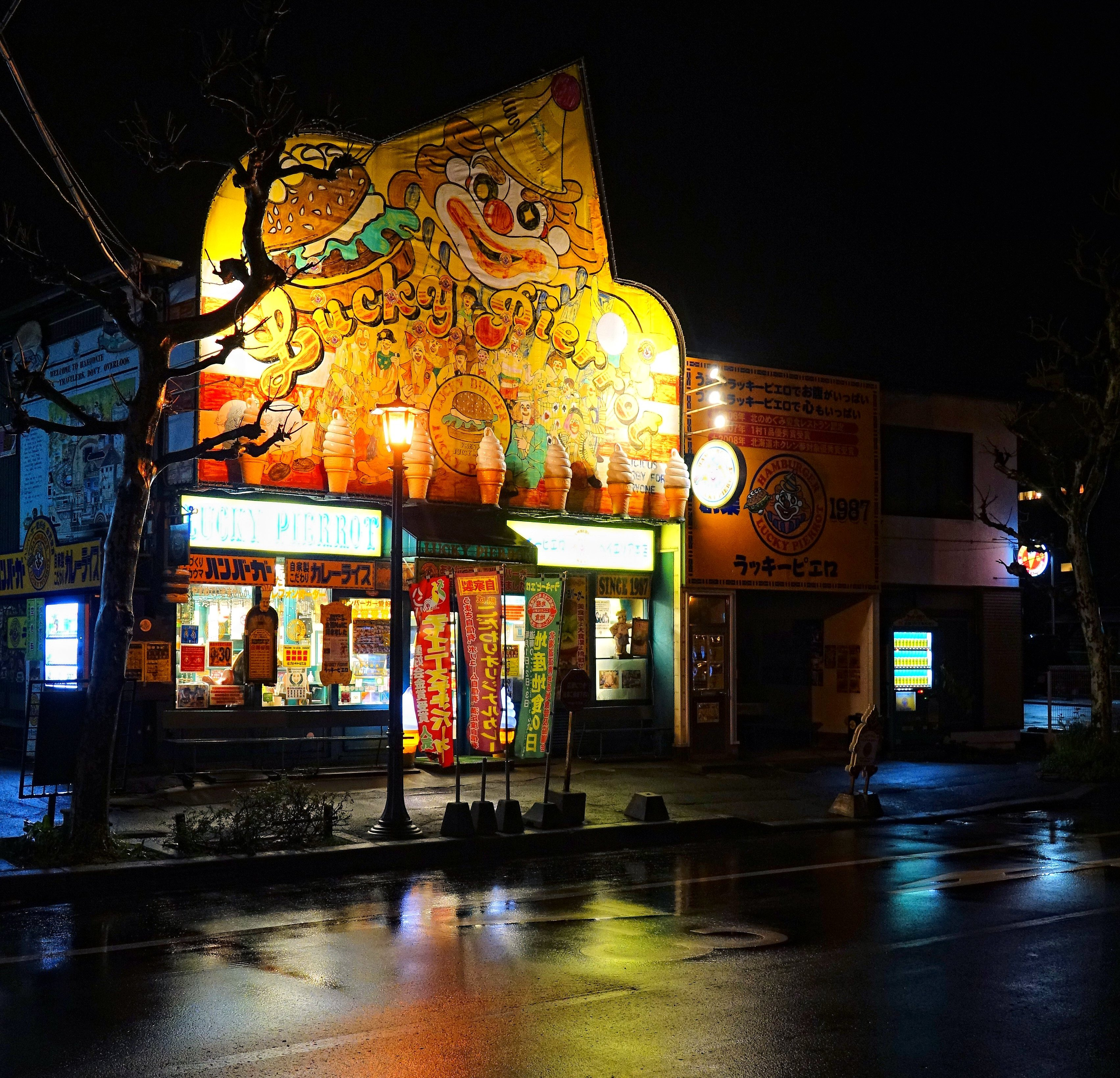
Lucky Pierrot's main restaurant in Hakodate's "Bay Area"

Lucky Pierrot is a Japanese chain of hamburger fast food restaurants founded in 1987. The company operates 17 stores in and around Hakodate, Hokkaido and serves 1.8 million customers per year. Each of its stores has a different theme.

The Nikkei named its Chinese Chicken Burger Japan's "best local hamburger". In 2005, the chain released a limited-edition hamburger with whale meat.
