= Whale meat =

Flesh of whales used for consumption by humans or other animals

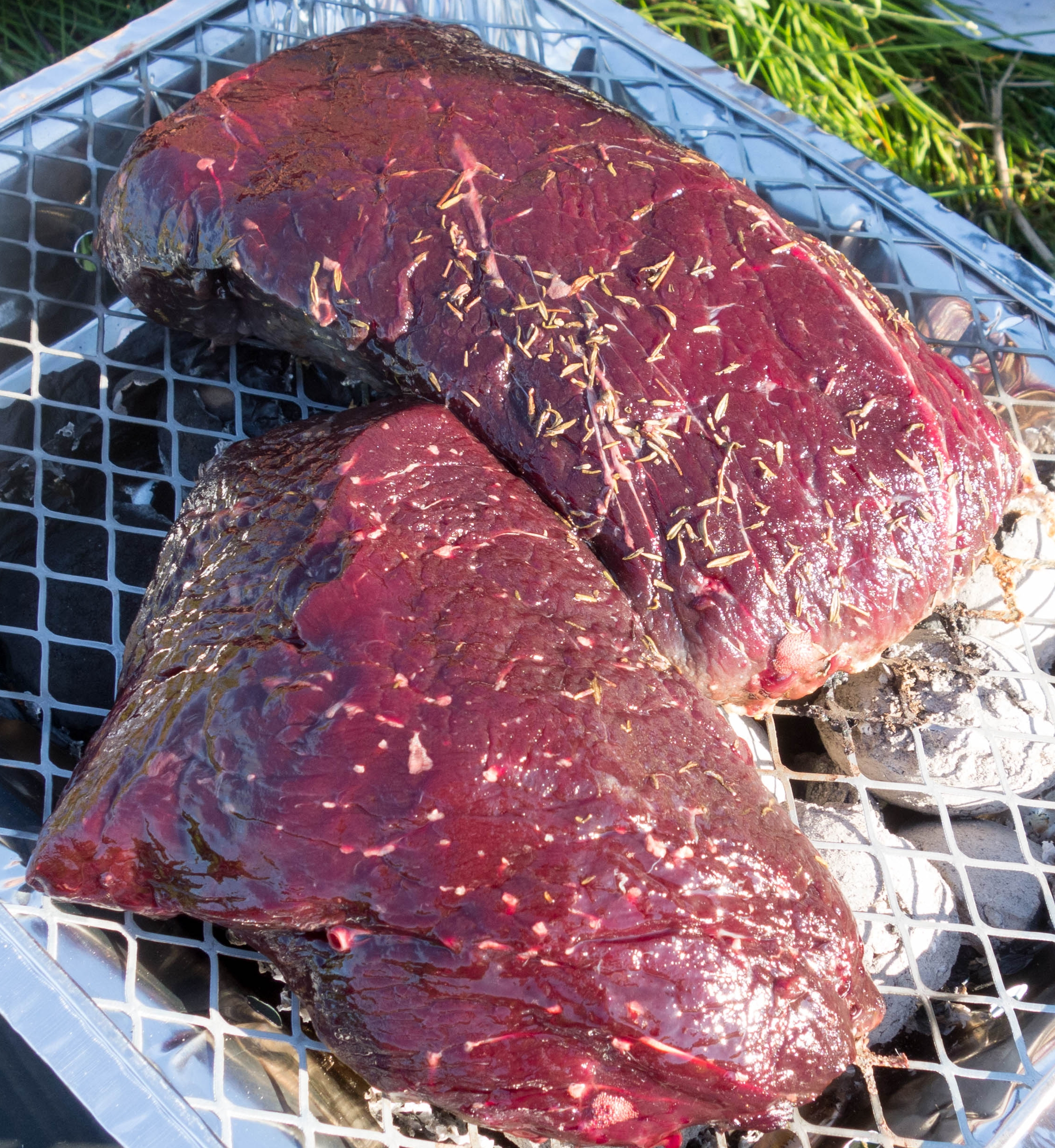
Raw whale meat in Norway

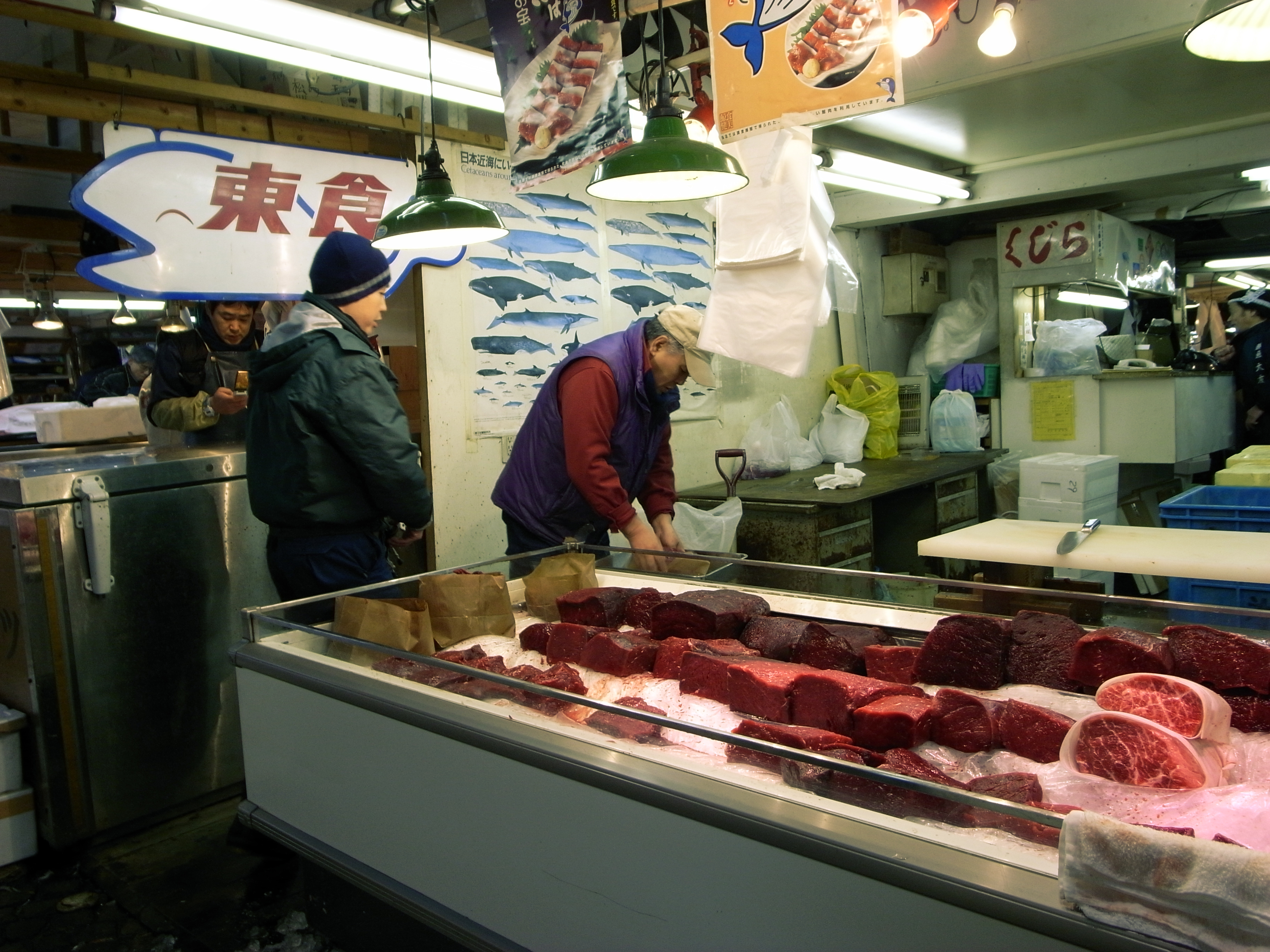
Whale meat on sale at Tsukiji fish market in Tokyo in 2008

Whale meat, broadly speaking, may include all cetaceans (whales, dolphins, porpoises) and all parts of the animal: muscle (meat), organs (offal), skin (muktuk), and fat (blubber). There is relatively little demand for whale meat, compared to farmed livestock. Commercial whaling, which has faced opposition for decades, continues today in very few countries (mainly Iceland, Japan and Norway), despite whale meat being previously eaten across Western Europe and colonial America. However, in areas where dolphin drive hunting and aboriginal whaling exist, marine mammals are eaten locally as part of a subsistence economy: the Faroe Islands, the circumpolar Arctic peoples (Inuit in Canada and Greenland, related native Alaskans, the Chukchi people of Siberia), other indigenous peoples of the United States (including the Makah of the Pacific Northwest), Saint Vincent and the Grenadines (mainly on the island of Bequia), some villages in Indonesia, and certain South Pacific islands.

Like horse meat, for some cultures, whale meat is taboo, or a food of last resort, e.g. in times of war, whereas in others it is a delicacy and a culinary centrepiece. Indigenous groups contend that whale meat represents their cultural survival. Its consumption has been denounced by detractors on wildlife conservation, toxicity (especially mercury), and animal rights grounds.

Whale meat can be prepared in various ways, including salt-curing, which suggests that consumption is not necessarily restricted to coastal communities.

== History ==
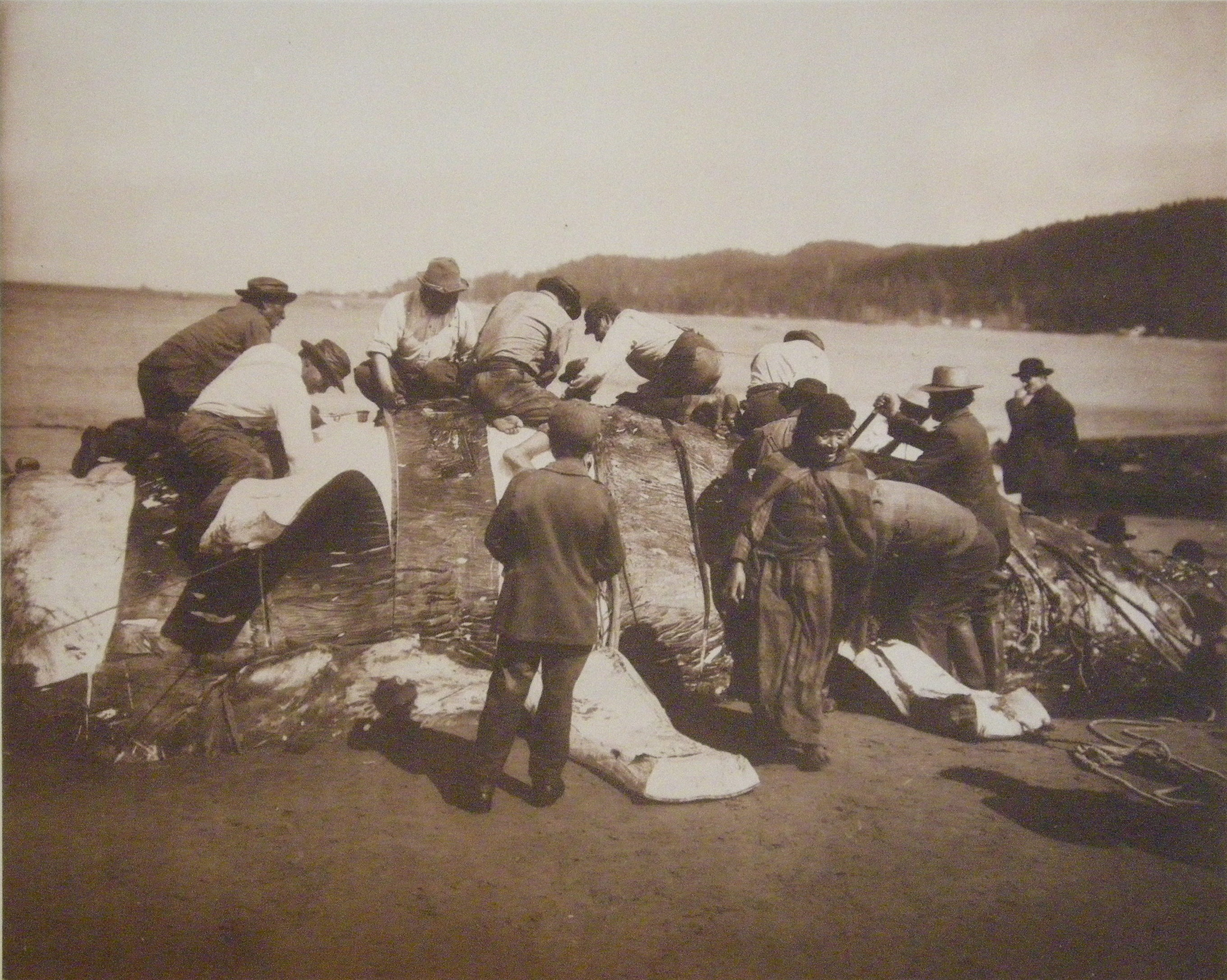
Native American whalers removing strips of flesh from a whale carcass at Neah Bay, Washington, 1910

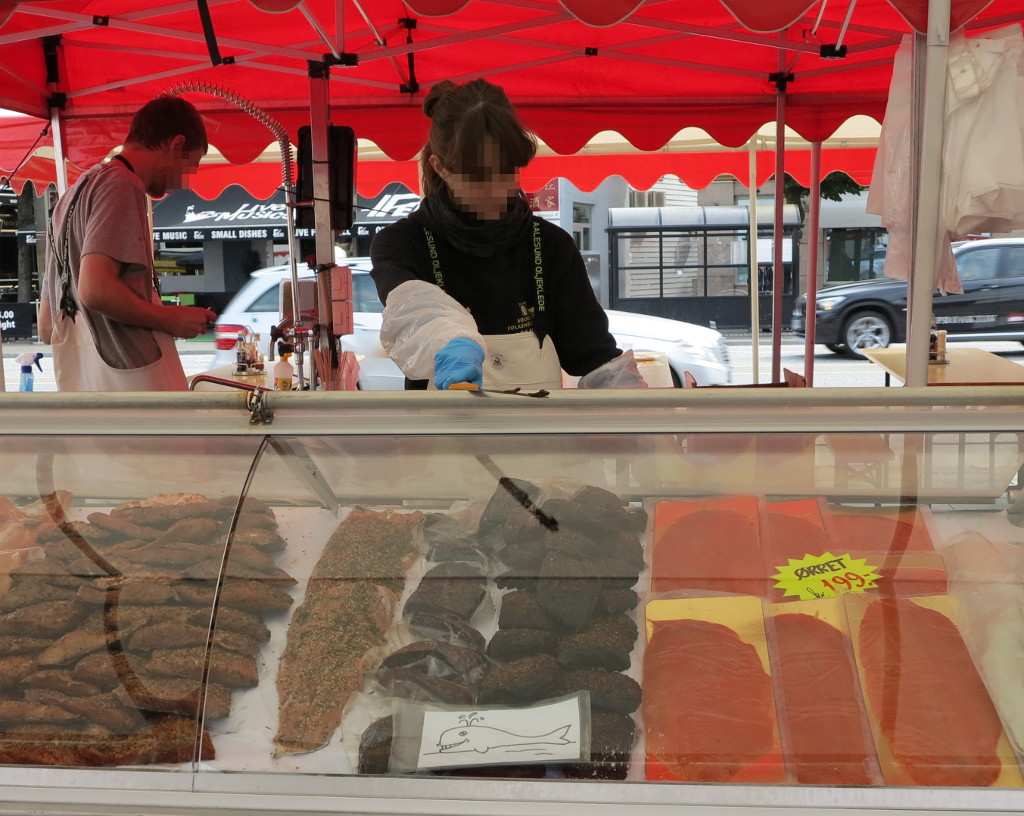
Whale meat on sale at the fish market in Bergen, Norway, in 2012

Whales were hunted in European waters throughout the Middle Ages for their meat and oil. According to Catholic practice at the time, aquatic creatures were generally considered "fish", therefore whale was deemed suitable for eating during Lent and other "lean periods". An alternative explanation is that the Church considered "hot meat" to raise the libido, making it unfit for holy days. Parts submerged in water, such as whale or beaver tails, were considered "cold meat". These practices were due to the laws of fasting and abstinence in the Catholic Church.

Eating whale meat did not end with the Middle Ages in Europe, but rather, whale stock in nearby oceans collapsed due to overexploitation, especially the right whales around the Bay of Biscay. Thus European whalers (the Basques, especially, were known for their expertise) had to seek out the New World to catch whales. The Dutch and Flemish were also active in the whaling commerce during the Middle Ages, and a number of records regarding the trafficking of whale meat and taxation on it occur from historical Flanders (extending to cities like Arras or Calais in the département of Pas-de-Calais).

French surgeon Ambroise Paré (died 1590) wrote that "the flesh has no value, but the tongue is soft and delicious and therefore salted; likewise, the blubber, which is distributed across many provinces, and eaten with peas during Lent". This blubber, known as craspois or lard de carême, was food for the poorer strata on the continent. The whaling industry in Canada and the United States may have supplied rendered fat, partly for consumption in Europe.

In early America, sailors onboard whalers may have eaten blubber after rendering, which they termed "cracklings" or "fritters", said to be crunchy like toast; these were certainly reused as fuel chips to boil down the fat. Colonial America also more commonly consumed the meat and other portions of the "blackfish" (or pilot whale). However, by the beginning of large-scale commercial whaling, whale meat was not consumed by the general American public, as it was not seen as fit for consumption by so-called civilized peoples.

== Species hunted ==
Minke whale is one of the most common species still hunted in substantial numbers. Baleen whales other than the minke are endangered, though they are taken in numbers by indigenous peoples who traditionally hunt them, and more lately, the whaling nations have resumed hunting larger baleen whales openly.

In 1998–1999, Harvard researchers published their DNA identifications of samples of whale meat they obtained in the Japanese market, and found that mingled among the presumably legal (i.e. minke whale meat) was a sizeable proportion of dolphin and porpoise meats, and instances of endangered species such as fin whale and humpback whale. (Blue whale DNA was also detected in the study, but researchers have attributed those findings to crossbreeding with fin whales, and that view has since been strengthened.)

In recent years Japan has resumed taking North Pacific fin whale and sei whales in their research whaling. The fin whales are highly desired because they yield arguably the best quality of tail meat (onomi). Japanese research vessels refer to the harvested whale meat as incidental byproducts which have resulted from study.

In Japan, the research whale meat was sold at officially published prices, but since 2011 an auction bid system has been adopted and actual realized prices have not been posted.

Cut of whale meat for sale	1998 (minke whale) official prices (converted to yen/kg)	2011 (Bryde's whale) reference price for bidding (yen/kg)
Special selection red meat	n/a	7000
Special grade red meat	4640	4500
1st grade red meat	3270	1700
2nd grade red meat	140	n/a
1st grade unesu (baleen whale underbelly, used for bacon)	5860	3000
2nd grade unesu	4380	2600

The channels through which premium cuts such as fin whale tail meat are sold remain opaque. A report by one of the Tokyo Two (Junichi Sato and Toru Suzuki), anti-whaling activists from Greenpeace, who intercepted whale meat package deliveries got no further than the sentiment by one restaurateur that it would take Nagatachō (i.e. high government) connections to get it.

== Regions ==
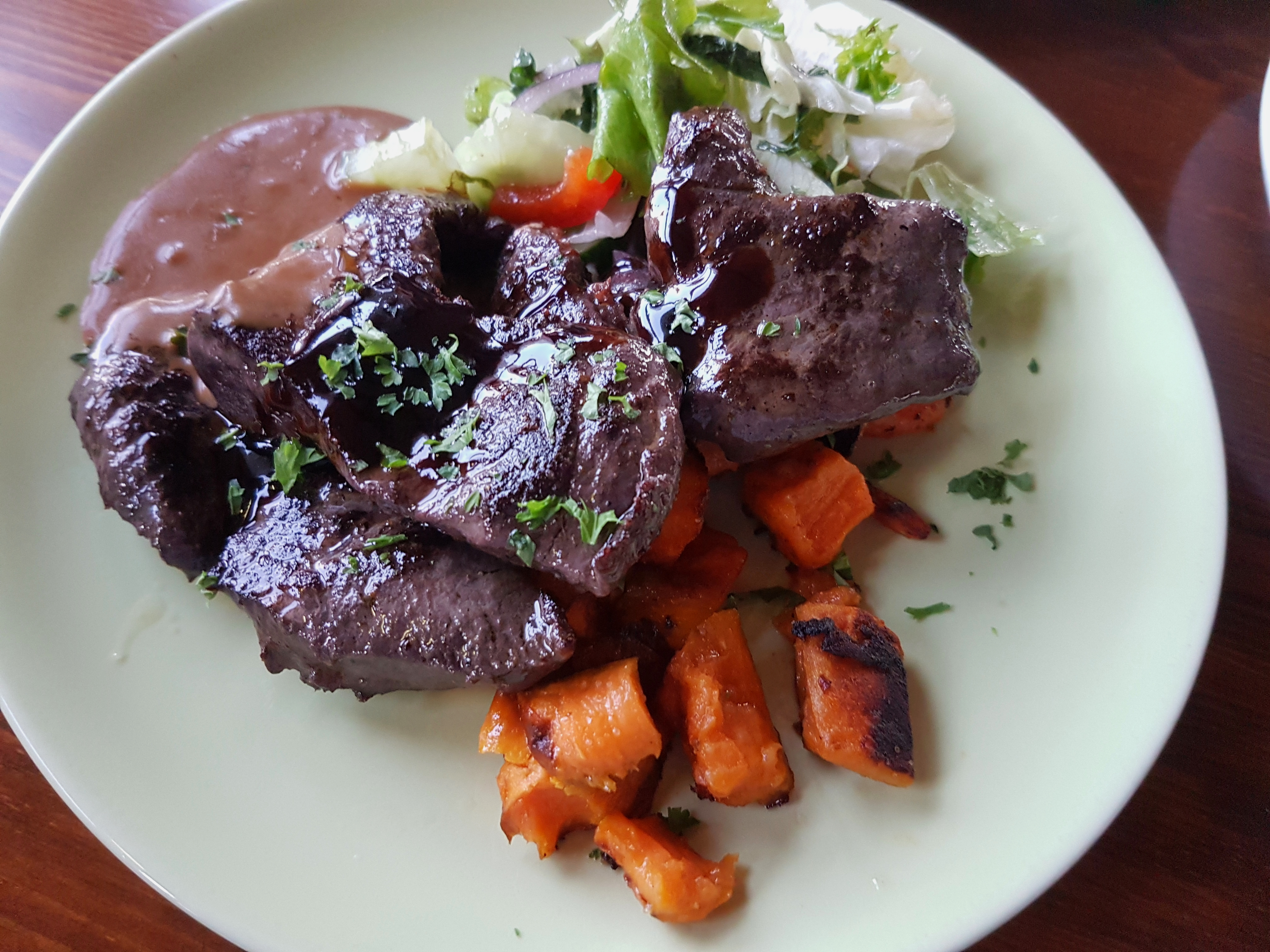
Marinated minke whale meat with sweet potatoes (Iceland, 2017)

In places such as Norway, Iceland, and Alaska, whale meat may be served without seasoning. However, it can also be cured or marinated, or made into jerky.

=== Norway ===
In Norway, whale meat was a cheap and common food until the 1980s. It could be used in many ways but was often cooked in a pot with lid in a little water so that broth was created and then served with potatoes and vegetables, often with flatbrød at the side.

=== Greenland ===
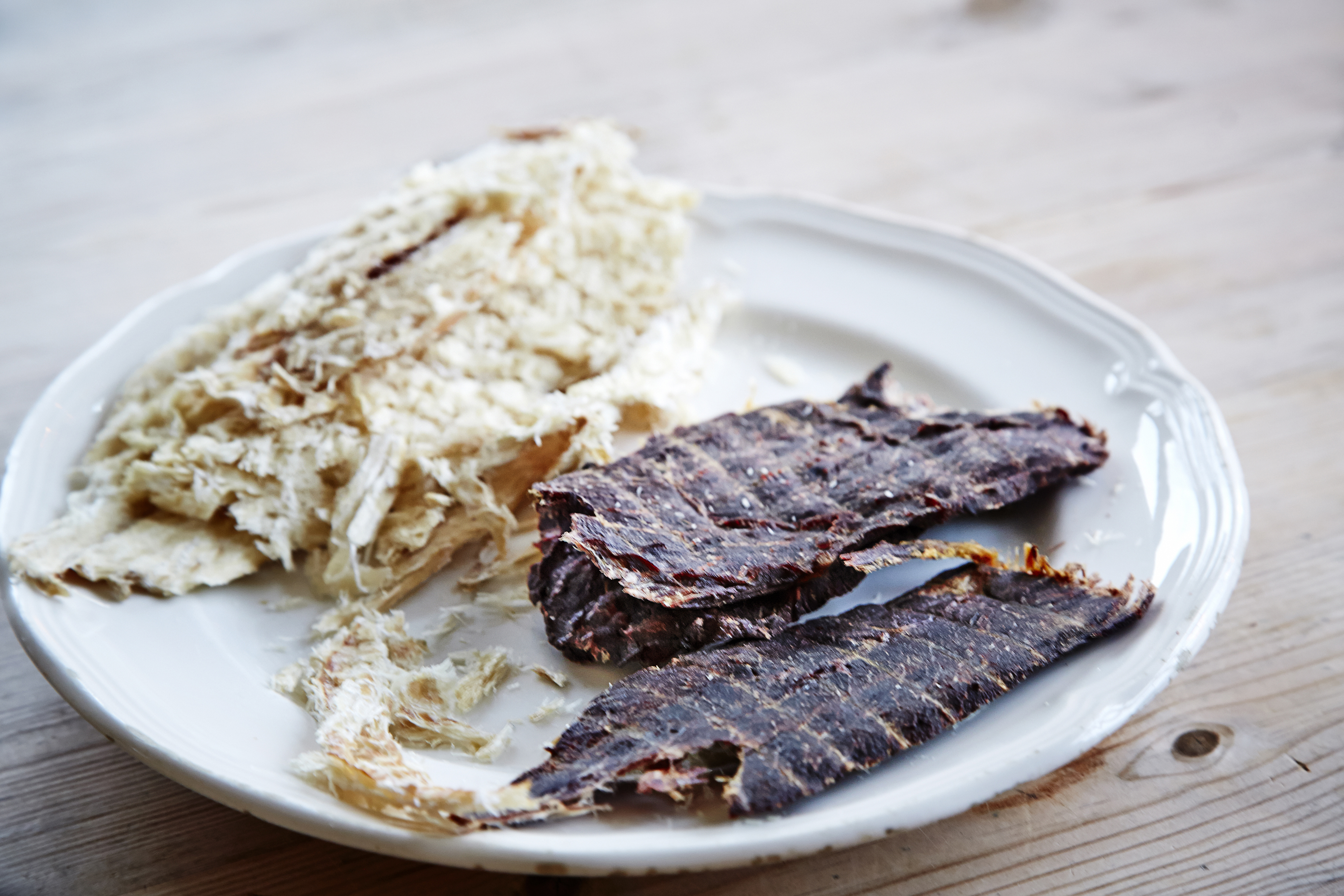
Dried fish and whale meats in Greenland (2013)

The consumption of whale meat by Greenlandic Inuit is part of their culture. However, in 2010, tourists also have begun to consume the meat. A Whale and Dolphin Conservation (WDC) investigation has documented the practice of commercial wholesalers commissioning subsistence whalers to supply the demand by supermarkets. Whale products in Greenland are sold in 4-star hotels.

=== Iceland ===
In a controversial and widely criticized move, Iceland has announced the renewal of a one-year permit allowing the resumption of commercial whaling activities. This decision has been met with significant disappointment and concern by environmental advocates and conservation groups worldwide.

=== Japan ===
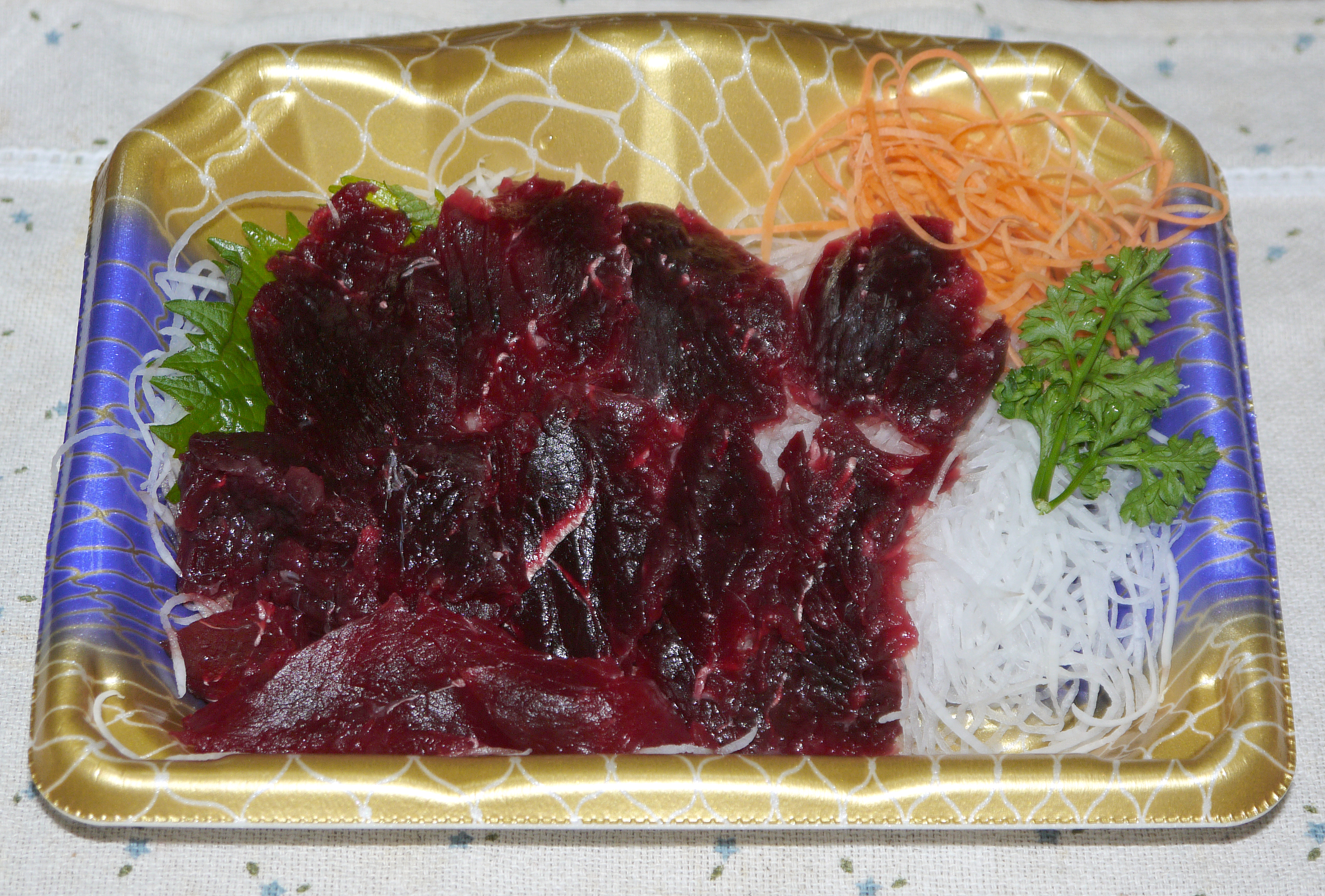
Sashimi of whale meat

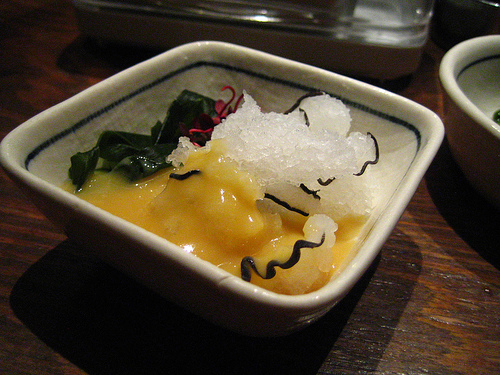
The fluke (oba) which are thinly sliced and rinsed (sarashi kujira). Topped with vinegar-miso sauce. (Tokyo, 2006)

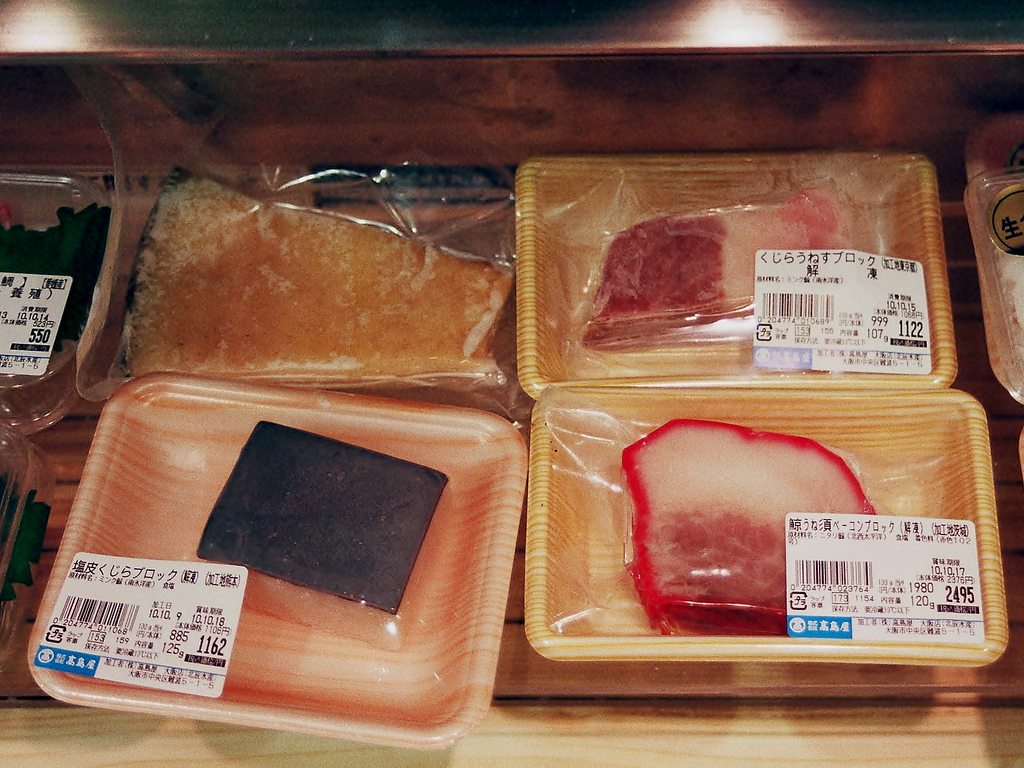
Assorted cuts of whale for sale at Takashimaya Department Store in Osaka (2010)

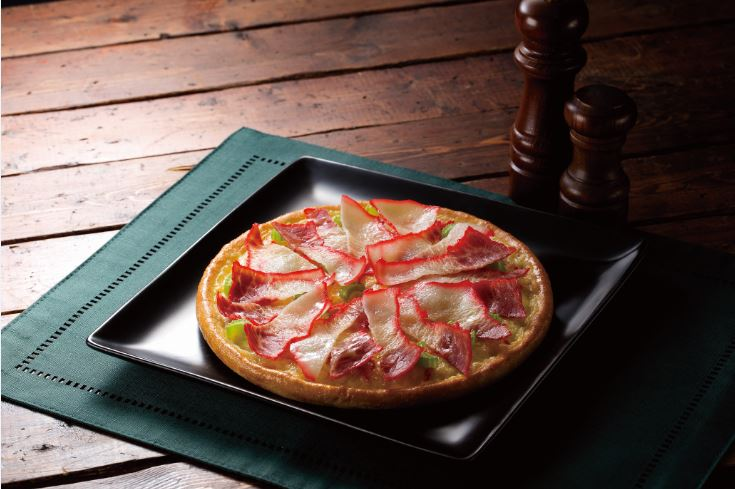
Whale bacon on pizza (Japan, 2014)

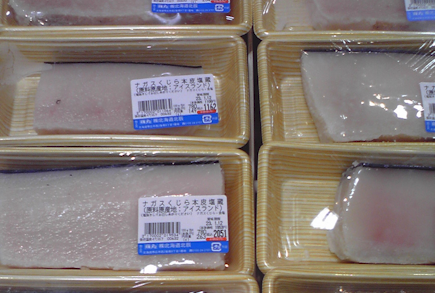
Icelandic fin whale meat for sale at a department store in Obihiro, Hokkaido (2010)

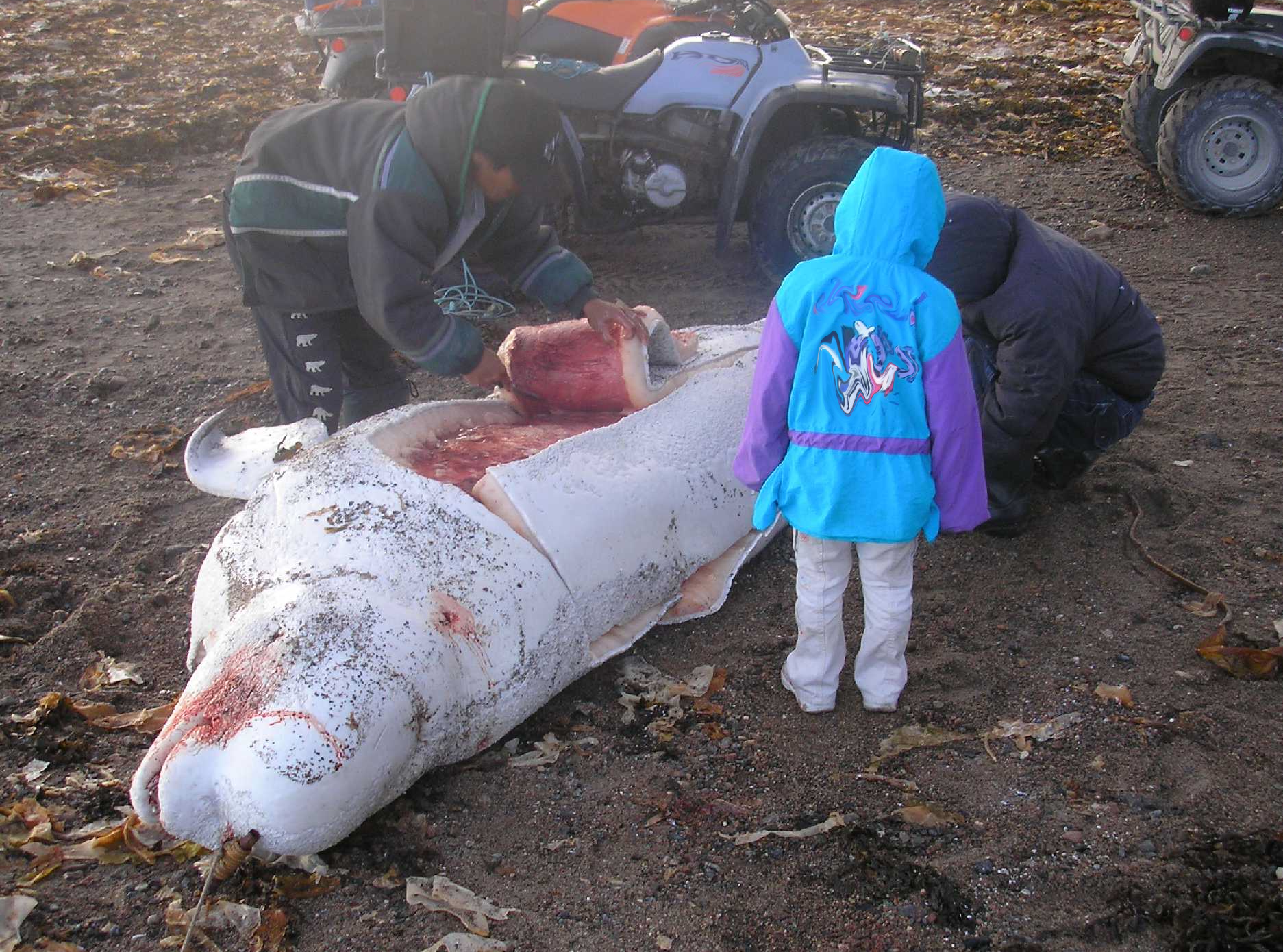
A beluga whale is flensed in Buckland, Alaska in 2007, valued for its muktuk which is an important source of vitamin C in the diet of some Inuit.

Whales have been hunted for meat in Japan since before 800 AD. After World War II, due to damage to Japan's infrastructure, whale meat became an important source of proteins.

In modern-day Japan, two cuts of whale meat are usually created: the belly meat and the tail meat. In the early 19th century, 70 different cuts were known. People still call the belly and tail cuts by their special whale meat names; also, different parts of the body such as the tongue retain their jargon names (see below). The tail meat is not the same as the fluke (tail flipper), and they go by different names.

As previously mentioned, different cuts of whale meat have specialised names. The belly meat, in the striped bellows-like underbelly of baleen whales "from the lower jaw to the navel", is called unesu (ウネス（畝須）) and is known for being made into whale bacon.

The prized tail meat, called onomi (尾の身) or oniku (尾肉), are two strips of muscle that run from the dorsal to the base of the fluke. The tail meat is regarded as marbled, and is eaten as sashimi or tataki. Masanori Hata (aka Mutsugorō), a zoologist author and animal shelter operator, has extolled the delicacy of the tail meat. It can only be derived from larger baleen whales, and the fin whale's meat has been considered superior. When the ban on this species was in place and Japan ostensibly complied, what was claimed to be genuine fin whale was still available, and legitimized as "grandfathered" goods, i.e., frozen stock from animals caught when still legal. In the past when blue whale hunting was still conducted by all nations, its tail fin was served in Japan.

The other portions are labelled lean, or "red meat" (赤肉, akaniku), and command much lower prices than the tail.

The fluke or tail flipper is referred to as either oba (尾羽) or obake (尾羽毛). After being cured in salt it is thinly sliced, scalded with hot water and rinsed, and served as sarashi kujira (pictured).

The tongue, called saezuri (さえずり), is often processed and used in high-end oden. The fried skin after the blubber is called koro, and analogous to "fritter/crackling".

- Harihari-nabe is a hot pot dish, consisting of whale meat boiled with mizuna.
- Sashimi of Abura-sunoko is striped layers of meat made from the root of the flippers.
- Udemono, consists of innards that have been boiled and sliced.

Some other dishes include cubed and grilled blubber, cartilage salads, and whale skin stew.

As of 2006, in Japan, 5,560 tons of whale meat worth ¥5.5 billion is sold in every year. The Japanese market has declined in recent years, with prices falling to $26 per kilogram in 2004, down $6 per kilogram from 1999. Fluke meat can sell for over $200 per kilogram, over three times the price of belly meat.

Greenpeace has alleged that some of the meat on sale is illegally sourced. They have claimed that it has been illegally smuggled from crew members of research ships and that more meat is caught than can be consumed by humans, with up to 20% of 2004's catch going unsold.

In modern times, whale meat is rarely eaten in Japan. A 2005 poll commissioned by Greenpeace and conducted by the Nippon Research Centre found that 95% of Japanese people very rarely or never eat whale meat.

=== Native Alaskan communities ===
For thousands of years, Alaska Natives in the Arctic have depended on whale meat. The meat is harvested from legal, non-commercial hunts that occur twice a year in the spring and autumn. The meat is stored and eaten throughout the winter.

Tikiġaġmiut, Iñupiat living on the coast of Alaska, divided their catch into 10 sections. The fatty tail, considered to be the best part, went to the captain of the conquering vessel, while the less-desired sections were given to his crew and others that assisted with the kill.

The skin and blubber, known as muktuk, taken from the bowhead, beluga, or narwhal is also valued, and is eaten raw or cooked. Mikigaq is the fermented whale meat.

=== Faroe Islands ===
Whaling in the Faroe Islands in the North Atlantic has been practiced since about the time of the first Norse settlements on the islands. Around 1,000 long-finned pilot whales (Globicephala melaena) are killed annually, mainly during the summer. The hunts, called "grindadráp" in Faroese, are organized on a community level.

Both the meat and blubber are stored and prepared in various ways, including Tvøst og spik. When fresh, the meat is often boiled. A part of Faroese cuisine, it can also be served as steak (grindabúffur). This dish comprises meat and blubber, which is salted and then boiled for an hour, served with potatoes. The meat can also be hung out to dry and then served in thin slivers. At parties some choose to serve "kalt borð" (cold table), which means a variety of cold food, which can include dried whale meat, dried blubber or blubber which is preserved in water with much salt in it, dried fish, dried sheep meat, etc. Traditionally, whale meat was preserved by hanging salted pieces (called "likkjur") outdoors under a roof to be dried in the wind. This method is still used today, particularly in villages. Today, both meat and blubber can also be stored in freezers.

In 2008, Faroe Islands Chief Medical Officer Høgni Debes Joensen and Pál Weihe of the Department of Public and Occupational Health recommended that pilot whales no longer be considered fit for human consumption due to the presence of DDT derivatives, PCBs and mercury in the meat. Their recommendation was based on research suggesting a correlation between mercury intake and the high rate of Parkinson's disease on the islands. As of 1 June 2011, the Faroese Food and Veterinary Authority has advised Faroe Islanders not to eat the kidney or liver of pilot whales, not to consume more than one serving per month, and, for women and girls, to refrain from eating blubber if they plan to have children and to refrain from whale meat entirely if they are breastfeeding, pregnant or planning to conceive in the following three months.

=== United Kingdom ===
During World War II the British Minister of Food introduced food rationing but allowed whale meat to be distributed 'off ration', i.e. without restriction. It was not popular because the smell whilst cooking was deemed 'unpleasant', and the taste was considered 'bland' even when spiced.

During the post-World War II period, corned whale meat was available as an unrationed alternative to other meats. Sold under the name "whacon", the meat was described as "corned whale meat with its fishy flavour removed", and was almost identical to corned beef, except "brownish instead of red". The Food Ministry emphasised its high nutritional value.

== Toxicity ==
Tests have revealed that in whale meat sold in Japan, high levels of mercury and other toxins are present. A research study was conducted by Tetsuya Endo, Koichi Haraguchi and Masakatsu Sakata at the Hokkaido University found high levels of mercury in the organs of whales, particularly the liver. They stated that "acute intoxication could result from a single ingestion" of liver. The study found that liver samples for sale in Japan contained, on average, 370 micrograms of mercury per gram of meat, 900 times the government's limit. Levels detected in kidneys and lungs were approximately 100 times higher than the limit. The effect is due to the animal's trophic level, however, rather than its size. This means that there is a significant difference between the mercury levels in toothed whales and baleen whales. The former have a much higher concentration as they feed from large fishes and mammals, while the latter feed from plankton.

A study done on children of the Faroe Islands in the North Atlantic showed neurological problems stemming from mothers consuming pilot whale meat during pregnancy.

== Environmental impact ==
In 2008 the pro-whaling interest group High North Alliance suggested that the carbon footprint resulting from eating whale meat is substantially lower than that of beef. Greenpeace responded that "The survival of a species is more important than lower greenhouse gas emissions from eating it." Many organizations, including Greenpeace and the Sea Shepherd Conservation Society, have criticised the whale trade for preying on endangered species, as studies have shown an alarming decrease in whale populations, which may significantly affect oceans and its foodchains, therefore, it may affect lives in the foreseeable future.

== Anti-whaling efforts ==
Groups such as the Sea Shepherd Conservation Society have attempted to disrupt commercial whaling with varying degrees of success.

== See also ==
- Sustainable seafood
- Food and drink prohibitions
- Subsistence hunting of the bowhead whale
- Whaling in Argentina
- Whaling in Chile
- Whaling in Madagascar
- Whaling in New Zealand
- Whaling on the Pacific Northwest Coast
- Whaling in the Philippines
- Whaling in Seychelles
- Whaling in South Africa
- Whaling in the Soviet Union and Russia
- Whaling in Western Australia
