= Whaling in the Philippines =

Whaling in the Philippines refers to the catching of whales in Philippine waters. Evidence of whaling in the archipelago was recorded as early as the seventeenth century.

Whaling has been banned in the Philippines since 1997.

== History ==
There is limited documentation of whaling in the Philippines. Filipino whalers often caught Bryde whales in the past. American and British whalers often caught sperm whales in Sulu, Mindoro and the Celebes. British whaling in the Philippines were reported to have occurred from 1820 to 1840 while American whaling was reported to have happened in 1825 and 1880 alongside local whaling by Filipinos in Bohol.

There was a short period of commercial whaling in the Philippines from 1981 to 1986. Philippine whalers fished within Philippine exclusive economic zone (EEZ) but it was reported that they also hunted Bryde whales in international waters. The Philippines was also a member of the International Whaling Commission from 1981 to 1988.

== Ban on whaling ==
Whaling in the Philippines has been illegal since 1997 under Fisheries Administrative Order 185 which was issued in 1991. The order initially included only the catching, selling, or transporting of dolphins but this was amended in 1997 to include all Cetaceans including whales.

The calls for a ban on whaling and dolphin hunting in the Philippines were raised by both domestic and international groups after local whaling and dolphin hunting traditions of residents of Pamilacan in Bohol were featured in newspapers in the 1990s. As a compromise for residents of Pamilacan who were dependent on whaling and dolphin hunting, whale and dolphin watching is being promoted in the island as a source of tourism income.

Despite the ban, it is believed that the whaling industry in the Philippines did not cease to exist but went underground.

== See also ==
- Environment of the Philippines
