= Tvøst og spik =

Whalemeat and potato dish of the Faroe Islands

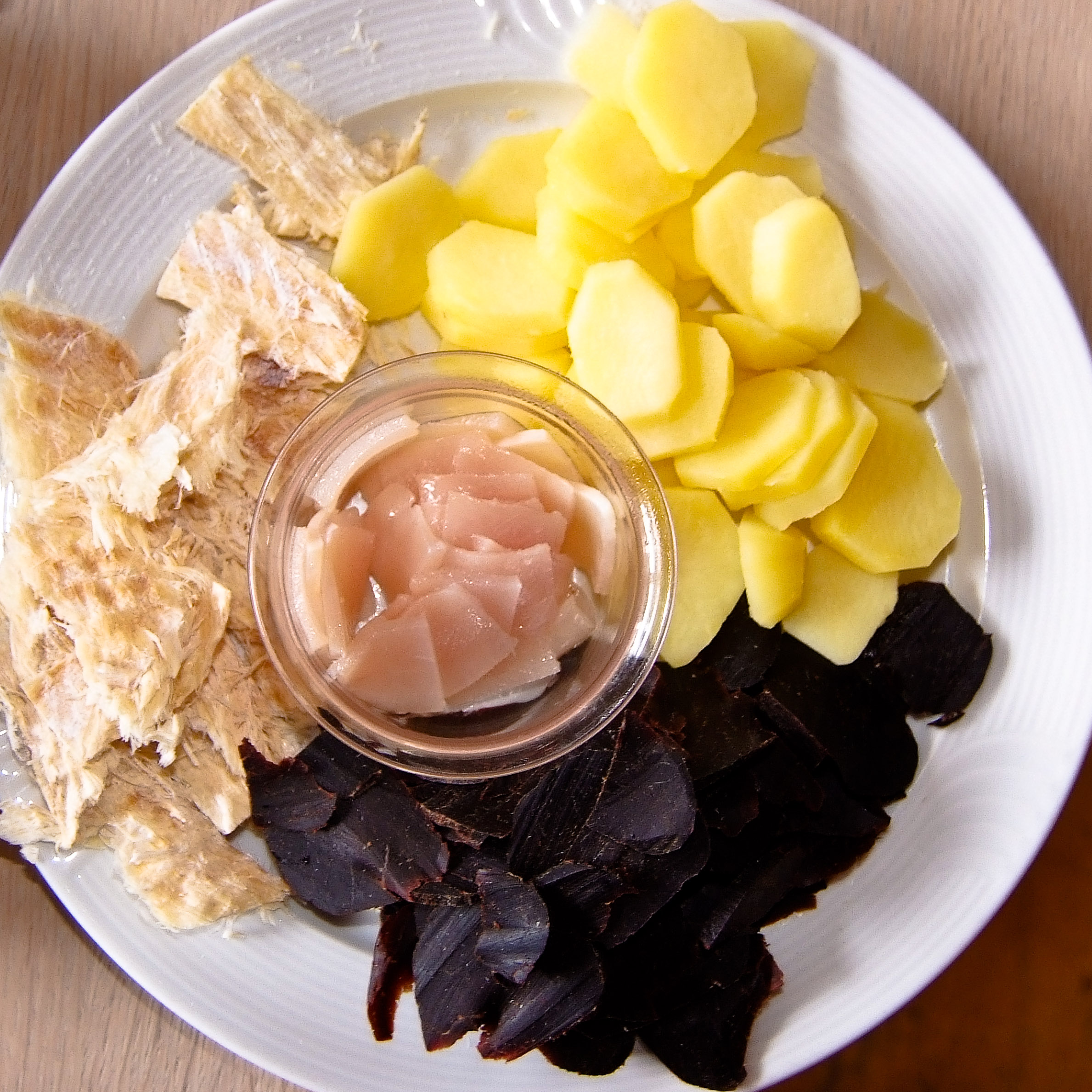
Tvøst and spik from pilot whale; the whale meat is called tvøst or grind, the blubber is called spik. On this plate are also dried fish and potatoes.

Tvøst og spik (also called grind og spik) is a typical dish of the Faroe Islands, a self-governing country of Denmark in the North Atlantic. Tvøst og spik consists of pilot whale meat, blubber and potatoes.

The meat is prepared in different ways; it can be boiled or fried fresh, it can be stored in either dry salt (turrsaltað) or in very salty brine (lakasaltað), it can be frozen and later prepared, or it can be hung up outdoors to dry, then cut in long slices (grindalikkja) and hung under a roof away from the rain.

The blubber can also be prepared in different ways, boiled, salted or dried, but not fried. Dried blubber can also be eaten together with dried fish, as shown on the photo. The meat is very dark, almost black.

The tradition of eating whale meat and blubber dates back many centuries, being first mentioned directly in the Faroese part of the Norwegian Gulating-law dating back to 1298. Given the isolation of the Faroe Islands in the North Atlantic, food supplies from other countries were traditionally sparse, forcing the islanders to manage with whatever nature had to offer.

Faroese culinary traditions thus evolved to make heavy use of animal products from households, such sheep, cows, geese, chicken and ducks, and maritime produce, from all kinds of fish and sea birds to, from time to time, whale meat and blubber.
