= Whaling on the Pacific Northwest Coast =

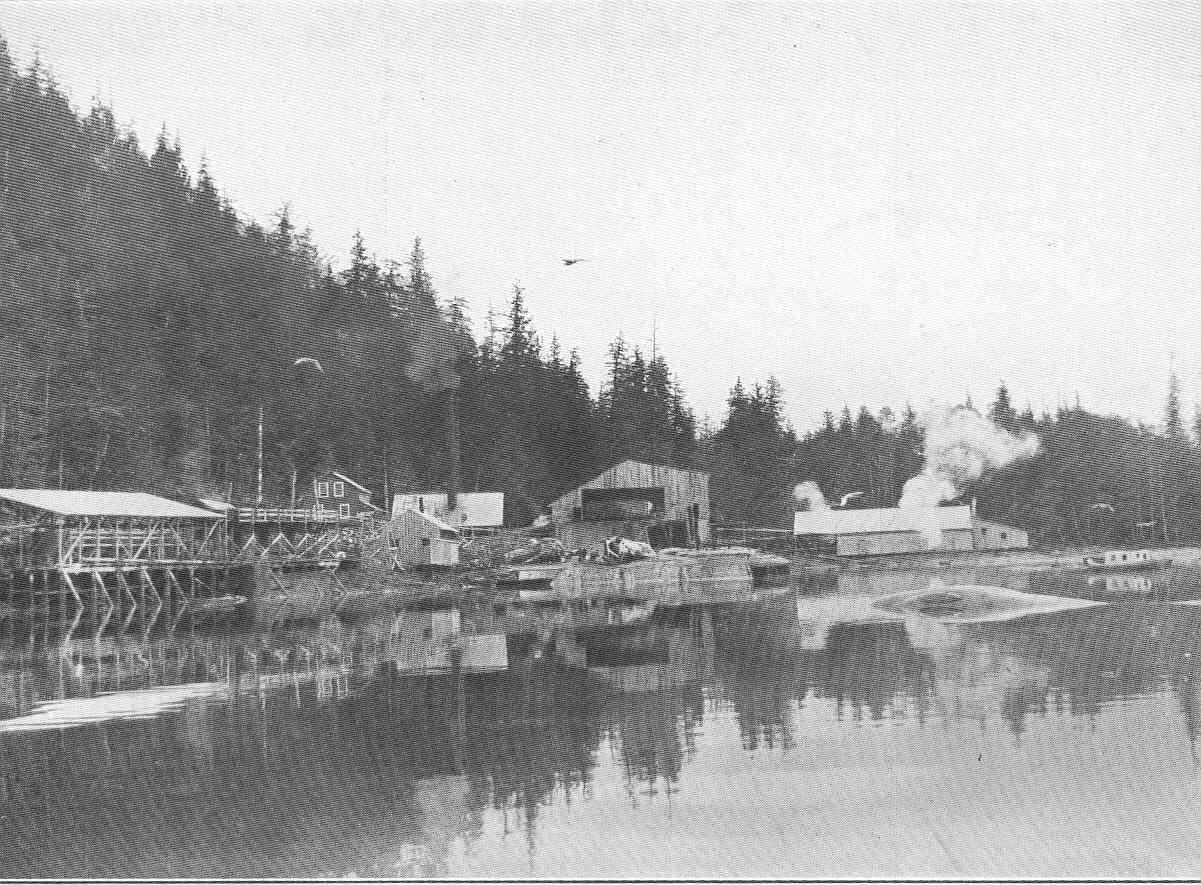
Shore whaling station in southeast Alaska, circa 1915

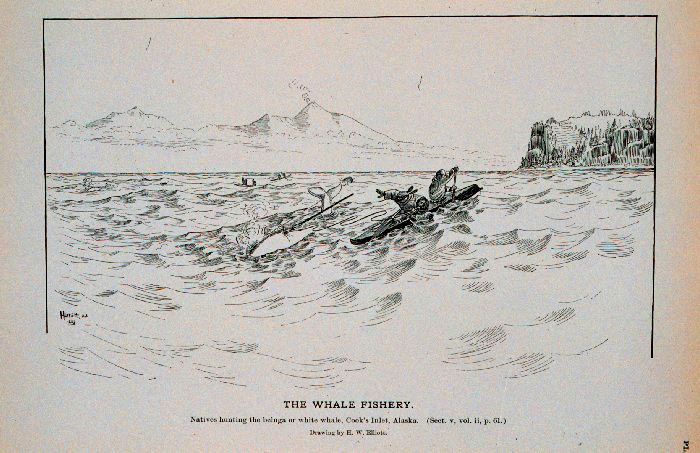
1883 illustration. "Natives hunting the beluga or white whale, Cook's Inlet, Alaska."

Whaling on the Pacific Northwest Coast encompasses both aboriginal and commercial whaling from Washington State through British Columbia to Alaska. The indigenous peoples of the Pacific Northwest Coast have whaling traditions dating back millennia, and the hunting of cetaceans continues by Alaska Natives (mainly beluga and narwhal, but also the subsistence hunting of the bowhead whale) and to a lesser extent by the Makah people (gray whale).

In the twentieth century there was a commercial whaling industry, small by global standards, in British Columbia and south-east Alaska, as evidenced by place names such as Blubber Bay. When Coal Harbour closed its whaling station in the late 1960s, the industrial killing of whales in Pacific Canada was over. By that point, marine entrepreneurs had moved on to hunting orcas (killer whales) for live capture, to be displayed in aquaria. That lasted about a decade, until public pressure put an end to it in the mid-1970s.

As the twentieth century whaling stations existed in British Columbia and Alaska, and so are covered in more detail in the articles Whaling in Canada and Whaling in the United States respectively, some of the pre-contact hunting – and, for that matter, some of the orca captures too – took place across the waters of the two countries, so this article will deal with the whole coast.

== History ==
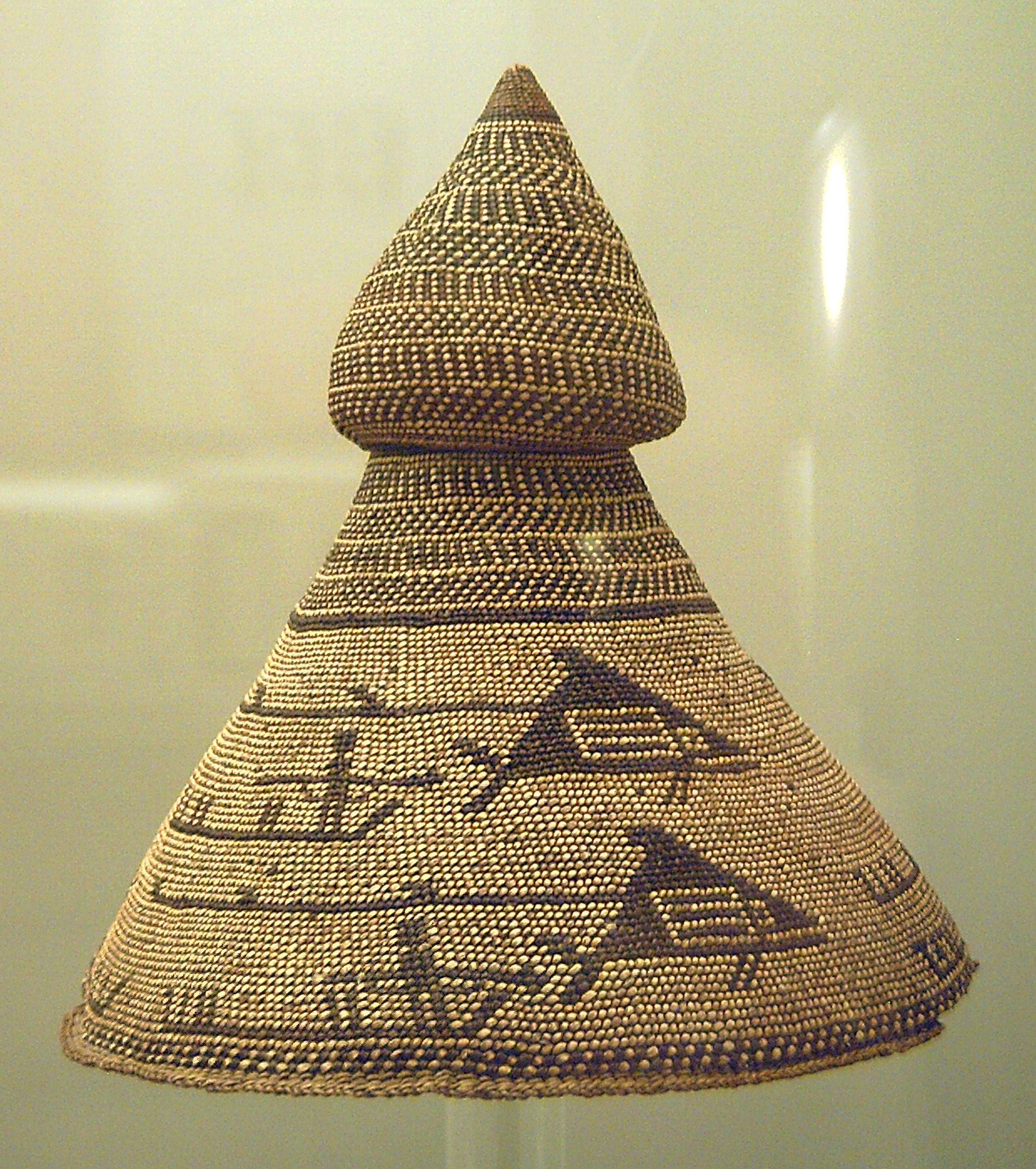
18th-century Nuu-chah-nulth whaler hat

Indigenous whaling traditions along the Pacific Northwest coast date as far back as 4000 years BCE and are deeply intertwined with the culture of many pre-contact Indigenous peoples in these territories.

Amongst the Nuu-Chah-Nulth, Makah, and Ditidaht (also known as the whaling people) similarities in whale hunting practices can be found. Ethnographic evidence shows whaling was practiced amongst the Mowachat, Ahousaht, Tla-o-qui-aht, Ucluelet, Tseshaht, Quileute, and Quinault. Evidence also connects pre-contact whaling practices to the Kwakwaka'wakw and Haida First Nations. Within each of these communities whaling has played an integral role in society, politics, and economy as well as cultural and spiritual activities. Whaling can be found in the oral histories, creation stories, music, and art of whaling peoples and as such has intimately impacted their governance and cultural identity.

== Traditions and rituals ==
Whaling holds a deep social and economic prestige for whaling First Nations and therefore could only be led by whaling chiefs. The more successful hunts a whaling chief had, the more power and wealth the chief held. The whaling chief (haw'iih) and his wife (haquum) were required to perform special rituals and ceremonies, often months prior to the whale hunt. It was believed that through the spirit world the haw'iih and haquum could connect to the whale, determining a successful hunt or not.

Beginning in the early morning, the whaling chief would bathe four times, being sure to completely submerge himself each time. After each submersion the chief would then take bundles of various branches and nettles and rub them over his entire body. The chief would slowly and purposefully imitate a whale's actions and movements, rising to the surface and blowing water from his mouth towards the middle of the body of water he was bathing in. His wife held a rope tied around his waist, symbolic of the harpoon, and would sing a song to the spirit of the whale, telling it how they wanted it to act during the hunt. The haw'iith and haquum were also required to practice abstinence during the ritual purification. While the hunt was in progress the haquum remained in the home, lying still and moving as little as possible. It was believed that during the hunt the haquum's power was so strong she could transform into the whale.

To take one example, Maquinna, chief of the Nuu-chah-nulth people of Nootka Sound during the heyday of the maritime fur trade in the 1780s and 1790s, worshipped at the Yuquot Whalers Shrine, which was eventually sold to an ethnographic collector and now resides in New York's American Museum of Natural History.

After successfully harpooning a whale, a member from the crew would make two cuts along its fluke. This would then be followed by a fatal blow to the whale's heart. Once the animal was dead, it was necessary to sew the mouth closed to prevent the carcass from sinking. This was done by cutting a hole in the top lip and lower jaw and tying the mouth closed. Floats made of seal skins would then be attached to the whale and the crews would begin towing the carcass back to shore.

Further ceremonies were held after a successful hunt in honour of the whale spirit that gave itself to the whaling chief and his people.

== Distribution of whale resources ==
Once the carcass was ashore, butchering would begin, with the most prized piece of flesh, the whale's saddle (including the dorsal fin), being given to the whaling chief. After receiving their cut of meat and blubber, the whaling chief and his wife would return home and hang the saddle outside their house for oil extraction. The meat and blubber would be adorned with eagle feathers and down in order to honour the whale's sacrifice. The lines of the harpoon used to kill the whale were hung on two poles and more feathers along with the whale's eyes were placed next to the saddle. Following the first cut of the whale, the remaining meat was subsequently distributed among the whaling crews and remaining community members based on social standing. For four days following the successful hunt, the whaling chief and his wife would host ceremonies giving thanks to the whale's spirit, culminating in a feast of the saddle for themselves and the crew.

Whaling season began in early spring with the migration of the grey whales from their breeding ground in the Baja peninsula. Grey and humpback whales made up the majority of whales hunted along Pacific Northwest coast.

Well adapted to the natural environment, pre-contact whaling people's obtained three-quarters of their meat and oil from whales. Whale oil was extremely high in nutrients and was extracted from the blubber, as well as, the bones. Bones were also used to make tools and household objects, as well as in architecture and water irrigation. Harpoon blades, made from sharpened mussel shells, were often adorned with whaling images. Harpoons were usually made from wood and had barbs made of bone or antler. Pacific Northwest canoes were often 28–38 feet long, big enough to fit an eight-man whaling crew.

== See also ==
- John R. Jewitt (1783–1821), an Englishman known for his memoirs as a captive of a whaling community
