= Whaling in Canada =

Commercial hunting of whales in Canada

Whaling in Canada encompasses both aboriginal and commercial whaling, and has existed on all three Canadian oceans, Atlantic, Pacific, and Arctic. The indigenous peoples of the Pacific Northwest Coast have whaling traditions dating back millennia, and the hunting of cetaceans continues by Inuit (mostly beluga and narwhal, but also the subsistence hunting of the bowhead whale). By the late 20th century, watching whales was a more profitable enterprise than hunting them.

== Pre-contact ==
Stranded whales, or drift whales that died at sea and washed ashore, provided useful resources such as meat, blubber (rendered into oil) and bone to coastal communities. Eponymous coastal features include Drift Whale Bay within Brooks Peninsula Provincial Park on the Pacific Coast of Vancouver Island.

Whaling on the Pacific Northwest Coast goes back millennia, and is deeply intertwined with the culture of the indigenous peoples there. The chiefs built private sacred places, called whalers' washing houses, where they could ritually purify themselves. The best known of these is the Yuquot Whalers Shrine, associated with the great Mowachaht chief Maquinna.

== 16th century ==
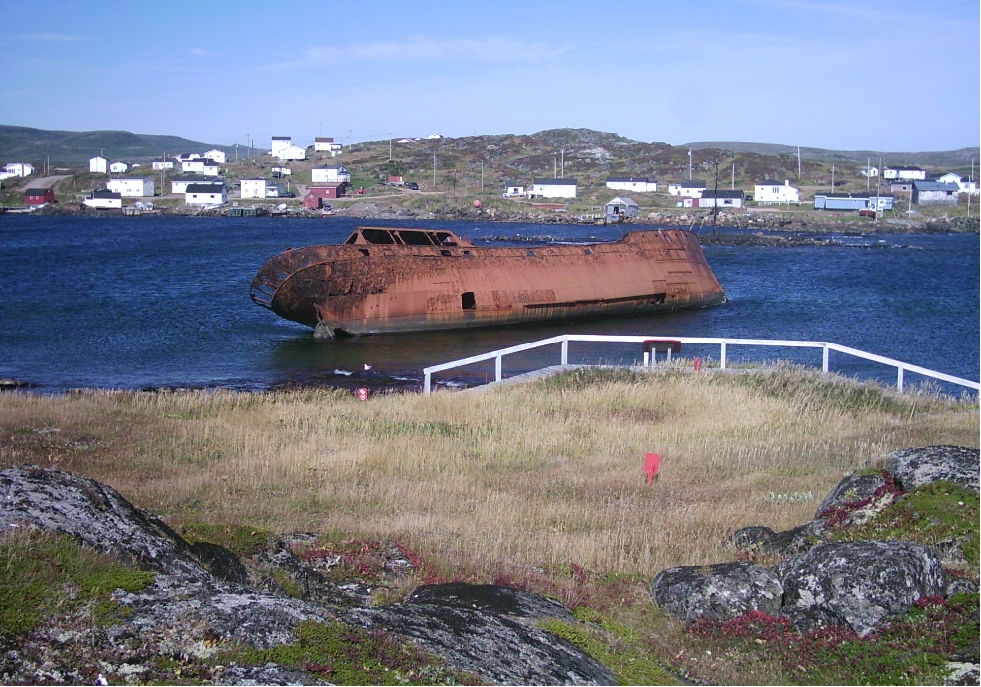
Basque archaeological site, Red Bay, Labrador

The Basque whalers reached Newfoundland and Labrador early, possibly a century before Columbus, but there is no evidence for this claim, and the first documented voyages to the New World are from the 16th century. By the second quarter of the 16th century the Basques were hunting in the Strait of Belle Isle, between the island of Newfoundland and the mainland of Labrador. They hunted the North Atlantic right whale and the bowhead whale, although the voyages had begun in search of cod.

== 17th, 18th, 19th centuries ==
The Basque "fisheries" ended by 1697.

By this point the British whaling industry was picking up, with ships sent predominantly from Scotland and London. Those that set sail for the Northern whale fishery went either east to the European Arctic (mostly whaling stations on Spitsbergen) or west past Greenland and into what is now the Canadian Arctic. By the 1650s they were whaling in Davis Strait, next to Baffin Island.

The Industrial Revolution massively increased the demand for whale oil, which led to more whaling all over the world. In Arctic Canada it was a significant way for Inuit to come into contact with the outside world. The Hudson's Bay Company opened trading posts such as Great Whale River in northern Quebec (1820), where products of the commercial whale hunt were processed.

== 20th century ==
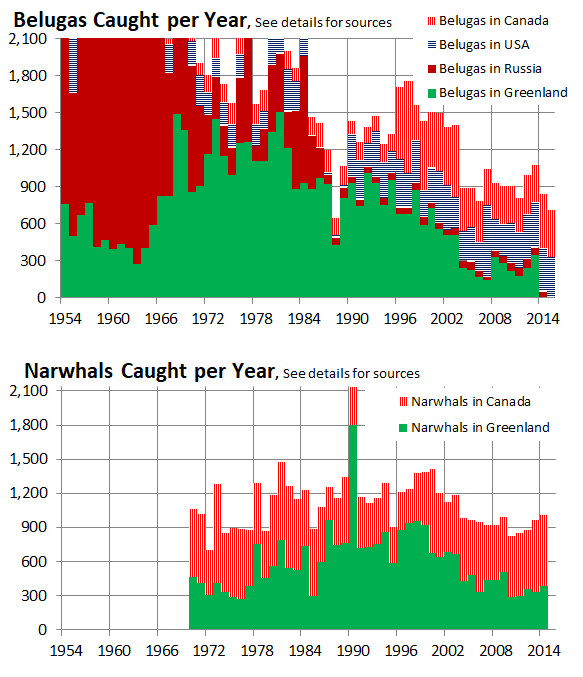
Beluga and narwhal catches

In the twentieth century there was a commercial whaling industry, small by global standards, in British Columbia, as evidenced by place names such as Blubber Bay. When Coal Harbour closed its whaling station in the late 1960s, the industrial killing of whales in Canada was over. By that point, marine entrepreneurs had moved on to hunting orcas (killer whales) for live capture, to be displayed in aquaria. That lasted about a decade, until public pressure put an end to it in the mid-1970s.

Whaling by First Nations continues to the present. Data for narwhals start in 1972, with 600 narwhals killed per year in the 1970s, dropping to 300–400 per year in the late 1980s and 1990s, and rising again since 1999. Incomplete counts of beluga hunts, for the Beaufort Sea, begin in 1960, with 14 to 212 belugas killed per year. Parts of Nunavut and Nunavik are covered starting in 1996, with 400–700 killed per year. Bowhead whales are also taken: in northwestern Canada one each in 1991 and 1996, and in northeastern Canada one each in 1994, 1996 and 1998.

Pour la suite du monde, a classic of Canadian cinema, is a 1963 documentary in which the film producers persuaded the inhabitants of a St Lawrence island to try once again to catch a beluga, something they had not done for decades. The animal is trapped live, and transported by truck to an aquarium in New York City. According to the CBC, "Commercial hunting continued until 1959, and sport hunting lasted another two decades."

Canada withdrew from the International Whaling Commission following the 1986 vote for a moratorium.

== 21st century ==
Aboriginal whaling takes place in the Canadian Arctic. Canadians kill about 600 narwhals per year. They kill 100 belugas per year in the Beaufort Sea, 300 in northern Quebec (Nunavik), and an unknown number in Nunavut. The total annual kill in Beaufort and Quebec areas varies between 300 and 400 belugas per year. Numbers are not available for Nunavut since 2003, when the Arviat area, with about half Nunavut's hunters, killed 200–300 belugas, though the authors say hunters resist giving complete numbers. Bowhead whales are still hunted in northeastern Canada: two to four per year.

Harvested meat is sold through shops and supermarkets in northern communities where whale meat is a component of the traditional diet. Hunters in Hudson's Bay rarely eat beluga meat. They give a little to dogs, and leave the rest for wild animals. Other areas may dry the meat for later consumption by humans. An average of one or two vertebrae and one or two teeth per beluga or narwhal are carved and sold. One estimate of the annual gross value received from Beluga hunts in Hudson Bay in 2013 was CA$600,000 for 190 belugas, or CA$3,000 per beluga, and CA$530,000 for 81 narwhals, or CA$6,500 per narwhal. However, the net income, after subtracting costs in time and equipment, was a loss of CA$60 per person for belugas and CA$7 per person for narwhals. Hunters receive subsidies, but they continue as a tradition, rather than for the money, and the economic analysis noted that whale watching may be an alternate revenue source. Of the gross income, CA$550,000 was for Beluga skin and meat, to replace beef, pork and chickens which would otherwise be bought, CA$50,000 was received for carved vertebrae and teeth. CA$370,000 was for Narwhal skin and meat, CA$150,000 was received for tusks, and carved vertebrae and teeth of males, and CA$10,000 was received for carved vertebrae and teeth of female Narwhals.

Cetaceans are not hunted elsewhere, although humans kill them via ship strike, fishing net entanglement, bio-accumulated pollution, and so on. This means some populations are not only endangered, but not recovering, as for example the talismanic Southern resident killer whales. On the other hand, the modern industry of whale watching is a booming business on Pacific and Atlantic coasts and in the St Lawrence estuary.

== See also ==
- John R. Jewitt, an English blacksmith who spent three years as a captive of the whale-hunting Nuu-chah-nulth people from 1802 to 1805
- Whaling on the Pacific Northwest Coast
- Whaling in the United States
