= Black mariners =

Sailors and mariners of African-American descent

Black mariners, alternatively referred to as African American mariners, were involved in maritime activities throughout the 18th and 19th centuries, especially within the Atlantic region. Emerging from communities such as Rhode Island. Martha's Vineyard, New Bedford, Charleston, New Orleans, and Philadelphia, they held significant positions aboard seafaring and whaling vessels, contributing to maritime exploration, trade, and cultural exchange. These mariners played essential roles in various aspects of maritime life, including navigation, trade, and exploration, leaving a lasting impact on maritime history and challenging societal norms of the time. Their experiences encompassed a wide range of activities, from participation in the transatlantic slave trade to involvement in whaling and seafaring voyages across international waters. Through their resilience, adaptability, and activism, Black Mariners left an indelible mark on the maritime world, shaping its course and influencing future generations.

== Seafaring and whaling during the Middle Passage ==
The role of Black Mariners in the transatlantic slave trade, particularly during the Middle Passage, remains a subject of historical discussion. This period saw Black Mariners navigating through perilous conditions as they transported enslaved Africans across the Atlantic Ocean.

=== Seafaring ===
Seafaring emerged as a common occupation available to free blacks during this era, offering steady wages and opportunities for international travel and cultural exchange. Many free blacks found employment aboard sailing vessels, where they could interact with Afro-descendant communities dispersed throughout the Americas, contributing to a sense of transnational black identity. Research suggests that African heritage seamen constituted a substantial percentage of crews aboard vessels departing from Newport, Rhode Island, for voyages to the Caribbean, Europe, and Africa.

=== Whaling ===
During the 18th century, a notable but small group of black whaling captains emerged, spanning from Massachusetts to California. Despite the prevailing racial inequalities of the time, these individuals thrived in their roles during and after the Civil War, a period marked by widespread bondage and servitude among their peers.

By the mid-19th century, the whaling industry engaged an estimated 70,000 individuals. Whales were primarily hunted for their oil, used for lighting lamps and manufacturing wool, leather, and soap. A typical whaling voyage lasted two to three years, with crew members receiving a percentage of the total value of the oil and bone harvested, commensurate with their positions and experience.

Black mariners were acknowledged among their crew on certain vessels in the whaling industry based on their reputation as diligent skilled workers. They were valued for their hard work and expertise in an industry characterized by physical demands, filth, and limited financial rewards for most participants.

=== Conditions ===
Numerous slave boatmen, navigating locally constructed periauger, operated within all-black crews, ferrying rice, indigo, and provisions between plantations and ports.

Efficiency drove transportation networks, facilitating the continuous movement of goods and people throughout the Atlantic World. This emphasis on efficiency minimized efforts to confine enslaved individuals to plantations, fostering regular interactions and information exchanges between diverse locales.

The mobility of enslaved maritime workers and plantation laborers facilitated communication, countering the dehumanizing effects of the plantation system. Despite oppressive conditions, they maintained connections with family and communities, preserving identity and agency beyond slavery's confines. This network served as a lifeline, enabling them to stay informed and maintain meaningful relationships despite constraints.

African mariners on slave vessels, especially those voyaging from the African Coast to the Caribbean, served a practical purpose. Their resistance to diseases like Yellow Fever, common among white crew members, ensured the stability and profitability of slave voyages. Additionally, they offered invaluable linguistic and navigational expertise, enhancing ship operations.

Seeking freedom, enslaved Africans often turned to the sea as a route to liberation. Runaway advertisements from the time reveal many escaping bondage in one coastal urban center to find refuge in others like New Bedford, Newport, Providence, and Martha's Vineyard, joining sailing crews. African heritage crew members filled various roles, from cooks to cabin boys to able-bodied seamen, using their positions to secure funds for the purchase of enslaved family members.

Despite the formidable challenges of the slave institution, both enslaved and free Africans displayed resilience and adaptability. For many in colonial Rhode Island, the maritime industry provided a path to freedom and prosperity.

== Maritime communities and culture ==
=== Martha's Vineyard: A Hub for Black Mariners ===
Martha's Vineyard, initially settled by Europeans and Native Americans following Englishman Thomas Mayhew's purchase of the island in 1641, became a significant center for maritime activities, attracting a diverse population, including Black Mariners. Over time, the island's economy evolved, with farming, brickmaking, and fish smoking becoming predominant industries in the 18th and 19th centuries. However, it was the emergence of a flourishing whaling and fishing enterprise, particularly centered in Edgartown, that marked a significant economic boom for Martha's Vineyard.

In the 19th century, Martha's Vineyard gained prominence through its thriving whaling industry, with ships embarking on voyages around the world to hunt whales for their oil and blubber. Black Mariners played integral roles in these maritime endeavors, serving as sailors, navigators, and captains aboard whaling vessels. Their contributions were essential to the success of the whaling industry, shaping the maritime culture of Martha's Vineyard and contributing to the island's rich history.

During the Harlem Renaissance, the island attracted prominent black writers seeking inspiration, and establishments like the Shearer Inn became vital gathering places for black artists and intellectuals, fostering discussions on race, religion, and class. These intellectual exchanges often intersected with discussions about maritime life, reflecting the close ties between Black Mariners and the cultural vibrancy of Martha's Vineyard.

Oak Bluffs, located off the coast of Boston, developed into a significant hub for African American vacationers, including Black Mariners seeking respite from their maritime journeys. In 1912, Charles Shearer, the son of a slave and her white owner, established the first inn for black vacationers in Oak Bluffs, providing a haven for African Americans facing discrimination elsewhere on the island. This marked the beginning of Oak Bluffs' transformation into a second home for successful African Americans from across the country, including Black Mariners who found camaraderie and community in this seaside retreat.

However, Martha's Vineyard's history is not without its complexities. Historically, blacks resided in Oak Bluffs, while whites settled in Edgartown, reflecting patterns of segregation and classism. Instances of housing segregation and prejudice were present, though not openly displayed.

In recent years, Martha's Vineyard has earned the nickname "The Black Hamptons," reflecting its popularity among wealthy African Americans as a vacation destination. It serves as a gathering place for members of esteemed black upper-class organizations, fostering connections and community among visitors from across the country, including descendants of Black Mariners who continue to honor their maritime heritage on the island. This phenomenon, often referred to as "Vineyard Magic," underscores the enduring cultural significance of the island within the African American community and its deep-rooted connection to Black Mariners and their maritime culture.

== Notable Black mariners ==
=== Profiles of influential Black mariners ===
This section explores the lives and legacies of notable Black Mariners who made contributions to navigation, trade, and exploration throughout history. From advocating for abolition to navigating the high seas, these individuals played roles in shaping maritime history and challenging societal norms. Join us as we delve into the stories of these figures and uncover their enduring impact on the maritime world.

Throughout history, several individuals have emerged as prominent figures within the maritime community, showcasing resilience, determination, and activism. Such figures as, Absalom Boston, Olaudah Equiano, Crispus Attucks, and Paul Cuffee, each made significant contributions to the maritime world and beyond.

=== Absalom Boston ===
Absalom Boston was a notable figure among Black Mariners, making significant contributions to both the maritime industry and the abolitionist movement. In 1822, at the age of 37, he achieved a milestone by becoming the first African American captain to command a whaleship with an all-black crew on a six-month voyage. Boston returned with 70 barrels of whale oil, and his crew safe. Boston's leadership and advocacy for racial equality extended beyond his maritime achievements, demonstrating the role of Black Mariners in advancing social causes

=== Olaudah Equiano ===
Olaudah Equiano, a prominent figure in the abolitionist movement, chronicled his experiences as an enslaved sailor in the Atlantic World. Originating from Montserrat in the Caribbean, Equiano leveraged his literacy to advocate strongly for the abolition of the slave trade and slavery itself. His writings influenced public opinion and contributed to the abolitionist cause, shedding light on the experiences of Black Mariners and their efforts to combat injustice.

=== Crispus Attucks ===
Crispus Attucks, a free black dockworker and sailor residing in Boston, played a significant role in American history as a martyr of the Boston Massacre. His involvement highlighted the struggles faced by black sailors and laborers in colonial America, emphasizing the challenges and injustices confronted by Black Mariners in their pursuit of freedom and equality.

=== Paul Cuffee ===
Paul Cuffee, born to a free black father and Native American mother, defied societal barriers to become a prominent captain, merchant, and shipowner in Dartmouth, Massachusetts. His influence extended beyond the maritime industry as he contributed to efforts to establish a community for free black individuals and promoted educational excellence, showcasing the diverse roles and contributions of Black Mariners in society.

== Maritime laws ==
=== Legislation against free Black sailors ===
Commencing with South Carolina in 1822, southern states enacted stringent laws, known as Negro Seamen Acts, mandating the imprisonment of all free black sailors while their ships were docked in port. These laws reflected concerns about the potential of black sailors to disseminate revolutionary ideas and harbor fugitive slaves, underscoring the challenges faced by Black Mariners in navigating discriminatory practices within the maritime industry.

By the 1840s, Charleston, Savannah, and Mobile each detained over two hundred free black sailors annually, according to contemporary estimates. Louisiana pursued a distinct strategy, arresting free black sailors under the guise of being fugitive slaves and incarcerating them in slave prisons until their captains paid substantial jail fees and removed them from the state. Sailors whose captains failed to retrieve them faced prolonged detention.

In slave societies, the concept of a "free black sailor" raised concerns among public authorities. There was apprehension about their ability to spread revolutionary ideas, instigate slave rebellions, and provide refuge for fugitive slaves seeking freedom. The New Orleans Commercial Bulletin stated in 1841 that black sailors were perceived as a significant threat to the peace of the South. This portrayal depicted them as posing a danger to societal institutions, with fears of inciting insurrection and violence.

=== African-American organizational triumphs ===
As early as 1780, free Africans in Newport established the Free African Union Society with the aim of promoting, preserving, and safeguarding African rights in Newport and America. This self-help African organizational model later expanded to cities such as New York, Philadelphia, Boston, and Providence, Rhode Island, demonstrating the resilience and collective efforts of Black Mariners to address issues of racial inequality and discrimination within their communities and the maritime industry.

== Bibliography ==
- Horne, Gerald. "Red Seas." Google Books, Google, 20 June 2005
- Finley, Skip. Whaling Captains of Color: America's First Meritocracy. Naval Institute Press, 2022.
- Costello, Ray. Black Salt Seafarers of African Descent on British Ships. Liverpool University Press, 2014.
- Lee, Debbie. "Yellow fever and the Slave Trade: Coleridge's The rime of the ancient mariner." ELH, vol. 65, no. 3, Sept. 1998, pp. 675–700, doi:10.1353/elh.1998.0026 (via Project MUSE)
- W. Jeffrey Bolster, Black Jacks: African American Seamen in the Age of Sail (Harvard University Press, 1988), pp. 5–6.
- Dresser, Tom, and Mark Alan Lovewell. Whaling on Martha's Vineyard. The History Press, 2018.
- Dresser, Tom. The Rise of Tourism on Martha's Vineyard. The History Press, 2020.
- Dawson, Kevin. "Enslaved ship pilots: Challenging notions of race and slavery along the peripheries of the revolutionary Atlantic World." Atlantic Biographies, 1 Jan. 2014, pp. 143–172, doi:10.1163/9789004259713_007.
- Bolester, Jeffery William. African-American Seamen: Race, Seafaring Work, and Atlantic Maritime Culture, 1750–1860, 1991, pp. 2–662.
- Mock, Valerie Ellen. Contributions of Black Entrepreneurs to the US Whaling Industry, Abolition, and Other Civil Rights, vol. 41, no. 2, 27 Nov. 2023, pp. 40–62.
- Equiano, Olaudah. The Interesting Narrative of the Life of Olaudah Equiano: First Published 1789. Hodder & Stoughton, 2021.
- Pattison, Eliot. Freedom's Ghost: A Mystery of the American Revolution. Counterpoint, 2024.
- Abegunrin, Olayiwola, and Sabella Ogbobode Abidde. Pan-Africanism in Modern Times: Challenges, Concerns, and Constraints. Lexington Books, 2016.
- Tsesis, Alexander. We Shall Overcome: A History of Civil Rights and the Law. Yale University Press, 2009.
- Harris, Robert L. Early Black Benevolent Societies, 1780–1830, vol. 20, no. 3, 1979, pp. 603–625. Autum.
