= Whaling in the United States =

Commercial hunting of whales in the United States

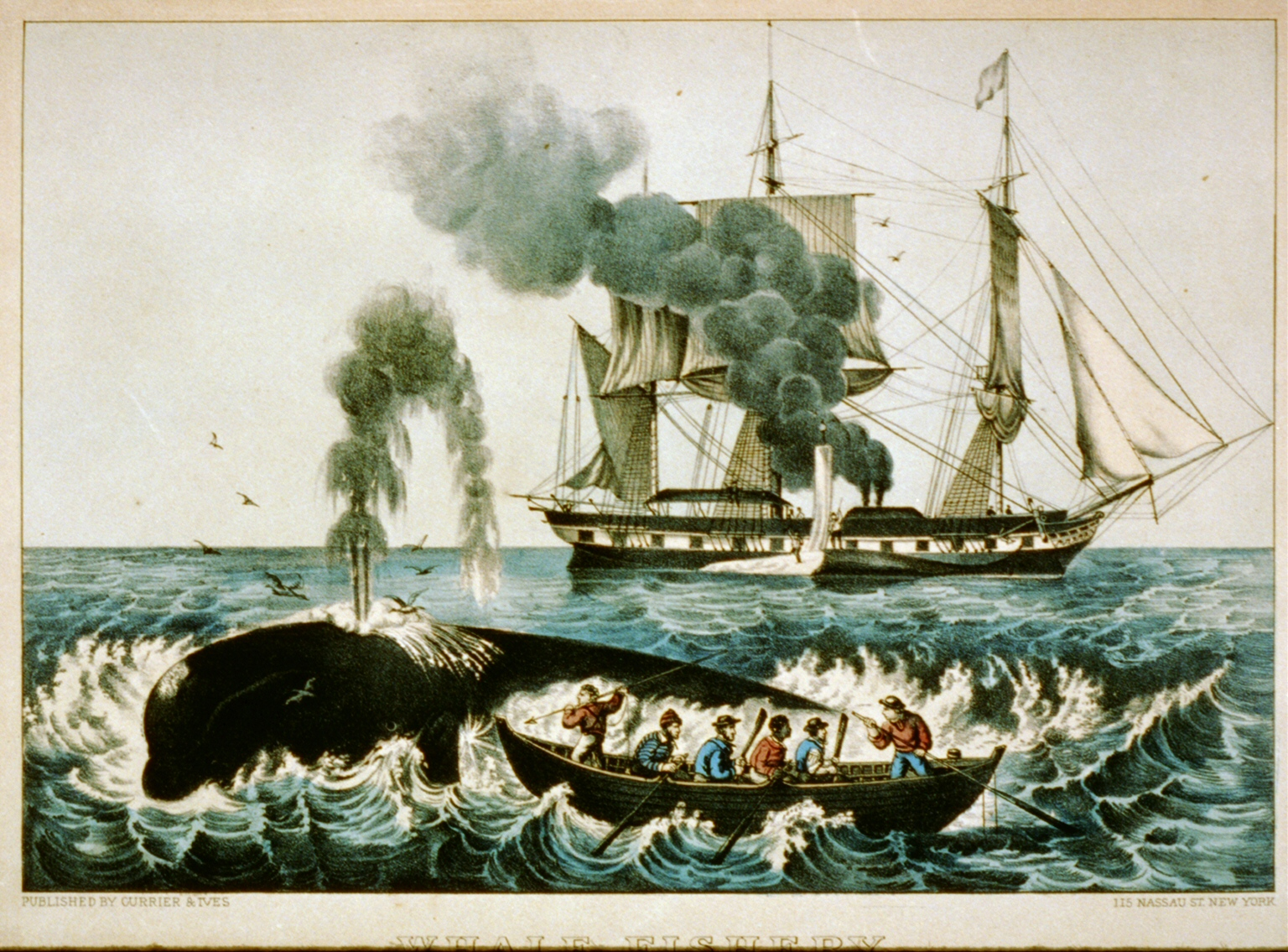
New England whaling c. 1860: Whale fishery – attacking a right whale, by Currier & Ives

Commercial whaling in the United States dates to the 17th century in New England. The industry peaked in 1846–1852, and New Bedford, Massachusetts, sent out its last whaler, the John R. Manta, in 1927. The whaling industry was engaged with the production of three different raw materials: whale oil, spermaceti oil, and whalebone. Whale oil was the result of "trying-out" whale blubber by heating in water. It was a primary lubricant for machinery, whose expansion through the Industrial Revolution depended upon it before the development of petroleum-based lubricants in the second half of the 19th century. Once the prized blubber and spermaceti had been extracted from the whale, the remaining majority of the carcass was discarded.

Spermaceti oil came solely from the head-case of sperm whales. It was processed by pressing the material rather than "trying-out". It was more expensive than whale oil, and highly regarded for its use in illumination, by burning the oil on cloth wicks or by processing the material into spermaceti candles, which were expensive and prized for their clean-burning properties. Chemically, spermaceti is more accurately classified as a wax rather than an oil.

Whalebone was baleen plates from the mouths of the baleen whales. Whalebone was commercially used to manufacture materials that required light but strong and thin supports. Women's corsets, umbrella and parasol ribs, crinoline petticoats, buggy whips and collar-stiffeners were commonly made of whalebone. Public records of exports of these three raw materials from the United States date back to 1791, and products of New England whaling represented a major portion of the American GDP for nearly 100 years.

Historic Aboriginal whaling within the boundaries of today's United States predated the arrival of European explorers, and is still practiced using the exception granted by the International Whaling Commission, which allows some subsistence hunting by Native Americans for cultural reasons. Catches have increased from 18 whales in 1985 to over 70 in 2010. The latest IWC quota regarding the subsistence hunting of the bowhead whale allowed for up to 336 to be killed in the period 2013–2018. Residents of the United States are also subject to U.S. Federal government bans against whaling as well.

== History ==
=== New England ===
The commercial whaling fishery in the United States is thought to have begun in the 1650s with a series of contracts between Southampton, Long Island resident English settlers John Ogden, John Cooper and the Shinnecock Indians. Prior to this, they chased pilot whales ("blackfish") onto the shelving beaches for slaughter, a sort of dolphin drive hunting. Nantucket joined in on the trade in 1690 when they sent for one Ichabod Padduck to instruct them in the methods of whaling.

The south side of the island was divided into three and a half mile sections, each one with a mast erected to look for the spouts of right whales. Each section had a temporary hut for the five men assigned to that area, with a sixth man standing watch at the mast. Once a whale was sighted, whale boats were rowed from the shore, and if the whale was successfully harpooned and lanced to death, it was towed ashore, flensed (i.e., its blubber was cut off), and the blubber rendered into whale oil in cauldrons known as "try pots." Well into the 18th century, even when Nantucket sent out sailing vessels to fish for whales offshore, the whalers would still come to the shore to boil the blubber.

In 1715, Nantucket had six sloops engaged in whale fishery, and by 1730 it had 25 vessels of 38 to 50 tons involved in the trade. Each vessel employed 12 to 13 men, half of them being Native Americans. At times the entire crew, with the exception of the captain, might be natives. They had two whaleboats, one held in reserve should the other be damaged by a whale. By 1732, the first New England whalers had reached the Davis Strait fishery, between Greenland and Baffin Island. The fishery slowly began to expand, with whalers visiting the coast of West Africa in 1763, the Azores in 1765, the coast of Brazil in 1773, and the Falklands in 1774. It wasn't until the 19th century that whaling really became an industry. In that time many whaling vessels had both Black men and native men onboard with white men.

=== Recruitment of whalers ===
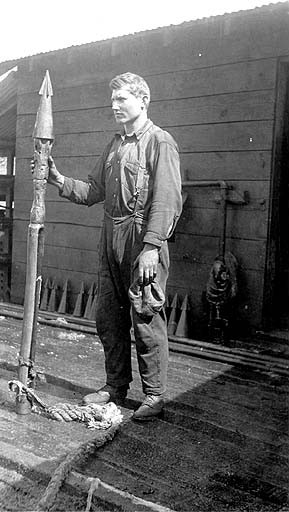
Alaskan whaler standing with a harpoon, 1915

According to Frances Diane Robotti, there were three types of whalemen: those who hoped to own their own whaleship someday, those who were seeking adventure, and those who were running from something on shore. Generally only those who hoped to make a career of whaling went out more than once. Many Black and indigenous whalers made several trips because of the economic prosperity it granted.

Since a whaleman's pay was based on his "lay", or share of the catch, he sometimes returned from a long voyage to find himself paid next to nothing, or even owing money to his employers. Even a bonanza voyage paid the ordinary crewman less than if he had served in the merchant fleet. The lay system was a gamble and sailors were never ensured decent wages. Richard Boyenton of the "Bengal" only earned six and a quarter cents after five months at sea, but occasionally sailors got lucky and brought home a significant amount of money after just a couple of voyages. More commonly sailors would earn very little after years at sea. Ships that returned to port less than full of oil were called "broken voyages" while ships that came home overflowing were praised. The Loper returned to Nantucket with its deck and hold chock full of casks of oil while ships like the Brewster prioritized oil so significantly that they threw food and water overboard to make more room for oil.

Going to sea was a young man's adventure, particularly when he wound up in the South Sea paradises of the Sandwich Islands, Tahiti, or the Marquesas Islands, where a young American man might find himself surrounded by young women ready to freely offer him their charms, something he was unlikely to experience at home. Many, including Herman Melville, jumped ship, apparently without repercussions. After his romantic interlude among the Typees on Nuku Hiva in the Marquesas, Melville joined another whaler that took him to Hawaii, from where he sailed for home as a crewman on USS United States. Along with Robert Louis Stevenson, Paul Gauguin, and others, Melville cultivated the image of the Pacific islands as romantic paradises. The California Gold Rush offered young men an adventure to California, for free if they signed on as a whaleman. Many whalemen (including captains and officers) abandoned the crew in San Francisco there, leaving abundant ships deserted in the bay.

Many Black and Indigenous whalers were recruited because of wages they could receive and because of racial stereotyping at the time.

=== Expansion ===
In 1768, the fishery began a huge expansion that was to culminate just prior to the American Revolutionary War. Between 1771 and 1775 the Massachusetts ports alone employed an average of 183 vessels in the northern fishery, and 121 in the southern. During the American Revolution and the Napoleonic Wars there was a complete shutdown of the industry, its peak growth came after the American Revolution.

The first New England whalers rounded Cape Horn in 1791, entering the Pacific Ocean to hunt the cachalot or sperm whale. At first they only fished off the coast of Chile, but by 1792, the sperm whalers had reached the coast of Peru, and George W. Gardner extended the fishery even further in 1818 when he discovered the "offshore grounds," or the seas between 105–125° W and 5–10° S. In 1820, the first New England whaleship, the Maro, under Captain Joseph Allen, hunted sperm whales on the Japanese ground, midway between Japan and Hawaii. The previous year the first New England whalers visited the Sandwich (Hawaiian) Islands, and subsequently these islands were used to obtain fresh fruits, vegetables, and more crew, as well as to repair any damages sustained to the ship.

In 1829 the New England fleet numbered 203 sail; in five years time it more than doubled to 421 vessels, and by 1840 it stood at 552 ships, barks, brigs, and schooners. The peak was reached in 1846, when 736 vessels were registered under the American flag. From 1846 to 1851, the trade averaged some 638 vessels, with the majority coming from such ports as New Bedford and Nantucket, Massachusetts; New London, Connecticut; and Sag Harbor, Long Island. By far the largest number sailed from New Bedford, but Nantucket continued to host a fleet, even when they needed to use "camels," or floating drydocks, to get over the sandbar that formed at the mouth of the harbor.

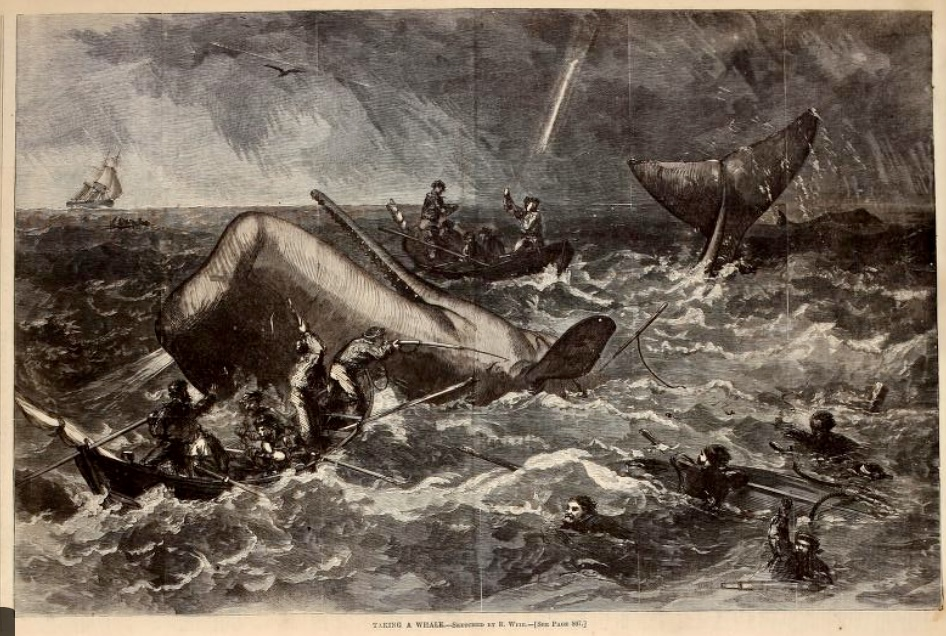
Taking a Whale by A. Weir Harper's Weekly, 1866

Thomas Welcome Roys, in the Sag Harbor bark Superior, sailed through the Bering Strait on 23 July 1848, and discovered an abundance of "new fangled monsters," or later to be known as bowhead whales. The following season fifty whalers—46 from New England, two from Germany, and two from France—sailed to the Bering Strait region on the report from this single ship. In terms of number of vessels and whales killed, the peak was reached in 1852, when 220 ships killed 2,682 bowheads. Catches declined, and the fleet shifted to the Sea of Okhotsk in 1853–1854. Whaling there peaked in 1855–1857, and once that area began to decline in 1858–1860, they returned to the Bering Strait region.

=== Peak ===
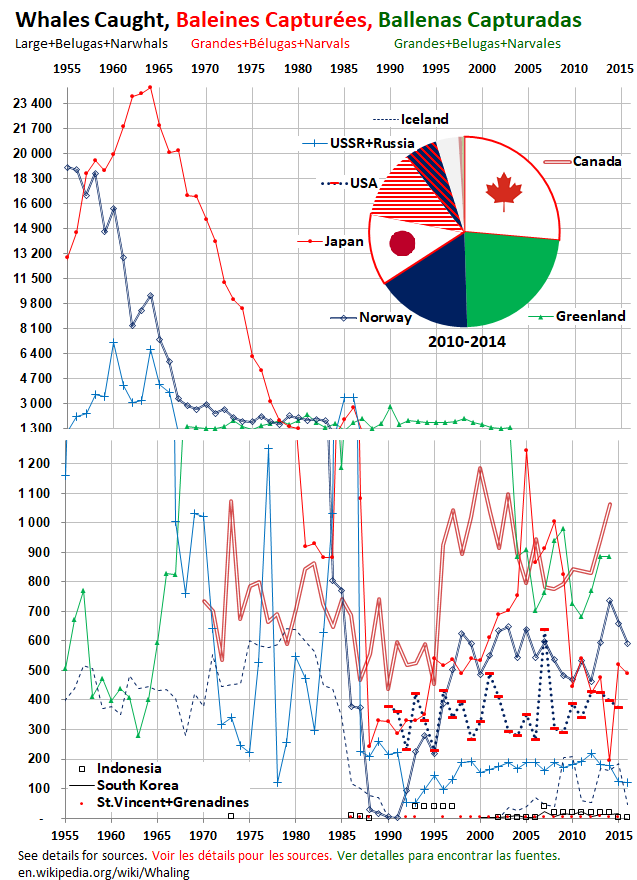
Whales caught by country and year, 1955–2016

The American whaling fleet, after steadily growing for 50 years, reached its all-time peak of 199,000 tons in 1858. Just two years later, in 1860, just before the Civil War, the fleet had dropped to 167,000 tons. The war cut into whaling temporarily, but only 105,000 whaling tons returned to sea in 1866, the first full year of peace, and that number dwindled until only 39 American ships set out to hunt whales in 1876.

During the winter, some of these same vessels would make their way to the lagoons of Baja California. The peak began in 1855, commencing the period of lagoon whaling known as the "bonanza period", when whaleboats were crisscrossing through the lagoons, being pulled by enraged whales, passing by calves that had lost their mothers and other ships' crews hunting whales. Less than twenty years later, in 1874, the lagoon fishery was abandoned entirely, due to several years of poor catches.

Several New England ships were lost during the 1860s and 1870s. During the American Civil War, Confederate raiders such as the Shenandoah, Alabama, and Florida captured or burned 46 ships, while the United States purchased forty of the fleet's oldest hulls. Known as the Stone Fleet, these ships were purchased to sink in Charleston and Savannah harbors in a failed attempt to blockade those ports. Thirty-three of the 40 whalers that comprised the Arctic fleet were lost near Point Belcher and Wainwright Inlet in the whaling disaster of 1871, while another 12 ships were lost in 1876.

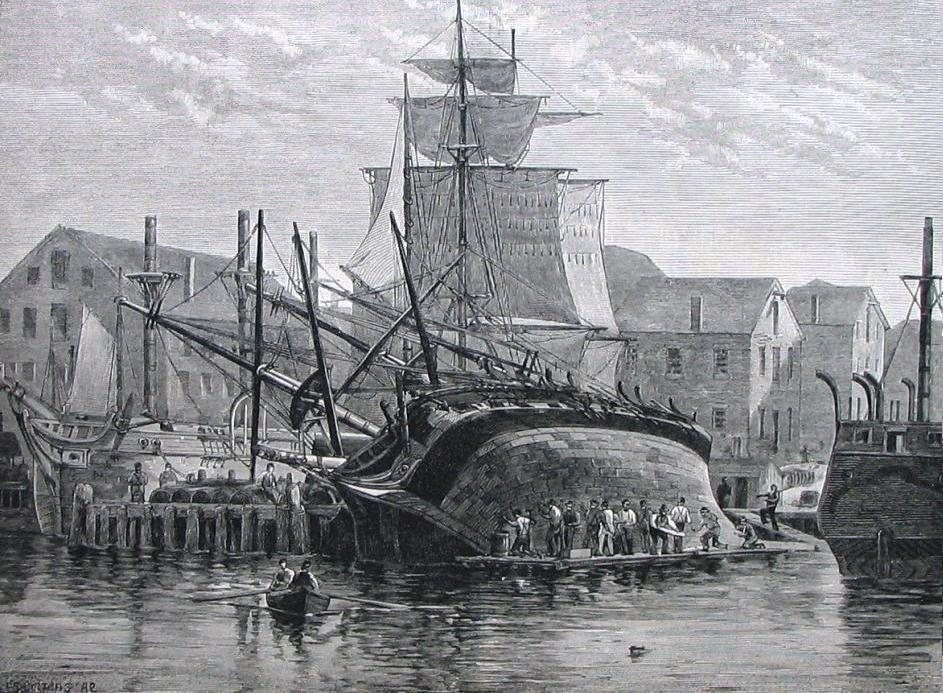
An old whaler hove down for repairs near New Bedford, 1882 by Frederick Schiller Cozzens

The use of steam, the high prices for whalebone, and the proximity of the whaling grounds brought the rise of San Francisco as a dominant whaling port in the 1880s. By 1893, it had 33 whaleships, of which 22 were steamers. At first, the steamers only cruised during the summer months, but with the discovery of bowheads near the Mackenzie River Delta in 1888–1889 by Joe Tuckfield, ships begin to overwinter at Herschel Island, off the Yukon coast.

The first to go to Herschel was in 1890–1891, and by 1894–1895 there were fifteen such ships overwintering in Pauline Cove. During the peak of the settlement, 1894–1896, about 1,000 persons went to the island, comprising a polyglot community of Nunatarmiuts, Inuit caribou hunters, originating from the Brooks Range; Kogmullicks, Inuit who inhabited the coastal regions of the Mackenzie River delta; Itkillicks, Rat Indians, from the forested regions 200 miles (320 km) south; Alaskan and Siberian ships' natives, whaling crews and their families; and beachcombers, the few whalemen whose tour of duty had ended, but chose to stay at the island.

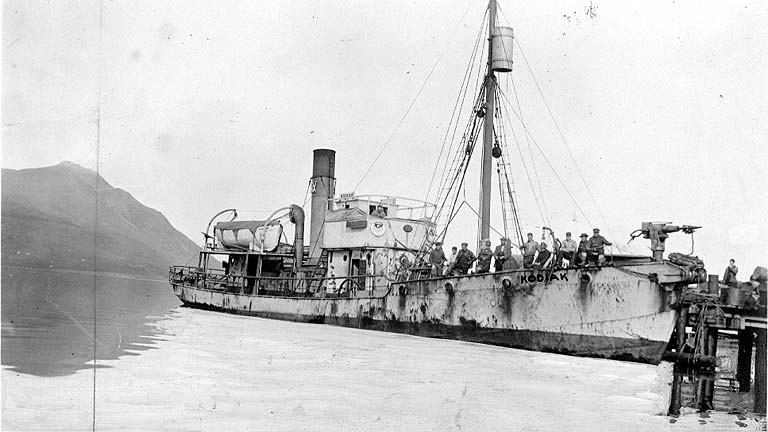
Whaling steamer Kodiak and crew, undated photo by John Nathan Cobb

Ships continued to overwinter at Herschel into the 20th century, but by that time they focused more on trading with the natives than on whaling. By 1909 there were only three whaleships left in the Arctic fleet, with the last bowhead being killed commercially in 1921.

=== Decline ===
New England whaling declined due to the mid-nineteenth century industrial revolution and the increased use of alternative fluids like coal oil and turpentine. By 1895, the New England whaling fleet had dwindled to 51 vessels, with only four ports regularly sending out ships. They were New Bedford, Provincetown, San Francisco, and Boston. Boston left the trade in 1903, with San Francisco leaving in 1921. Only New Bedford continued on into the trade, sending out its last whaler, the John R. Manta, in 1927.

=== Whaling ban and the Pelly Amendment ===
In 1971, U.S. Congress passed the Pelly Amendment to ensure that residents of the United States would comply with regulations issued by an international fishery conservation program, including the International Whaling Commission. In 1972, Congress passed the Marine Mammal Protection Act, which makes it illegal for any person residing in the United States to kill, hunt, injure or harass all species of marine mammals, regardless of their population status. Whales who are considered to be endangered are also protected by the 1973 Endangered Species Act. The 1979 Packwood-Magnuson Amendment to the Fishery Conservation and Management Act of 1976 extended the federal whaling ban to foreigners who chose to come within 200 miles of the U.S. coastline.

== Multi-racial crews ==
The whaling industry was not homogenous in race, there were a multitude of vessels that consisted of majority Black and indigenous crews. The participation of Black and indigenous whalers in the industry was an example of the agency that these groups acted upon in the midst of oppression, land dispossession, indentured servitude, slavery, disease, and discrimination. The whaling industry was arduous, men were often away for years at a time, away from their families, required men to exert a high demand of physical labor; the act of harpooning and catching a whale was difficult and not guaranteed, which made wage undependable. These liabilities made it so that Black and indigenous men could participate in an otherwise unwanted industry for white men’s standards.

Furthermore, whaling served as one of the only opportunities for Black and indigenous men to earn equal wages to white men, gain respect, and status, and find community with other whalers, white, Black and indigenous. Although conditions on whaling vessels allowed for somewhat equal opportunity economically and socially, the time period warranted racism and discrimination on the vessels, and were often to the discretion of each captain. In many instances a black or indigenous man could be a second mate, but be barred from social activities between other captains and second mates of another vessel. There have been recorded instances of the use of racial slurs against Black and indigenous men onboard, and even some instances of wage discrimination where a black or indigenous man could end up in debt to their captain after a voyage. Black and indigenous men were instrumental to the success of the whaling industry contributing their labor, and were able to make lives for themselves and their families, even when subjected to the smatterings of racism that were present on board.

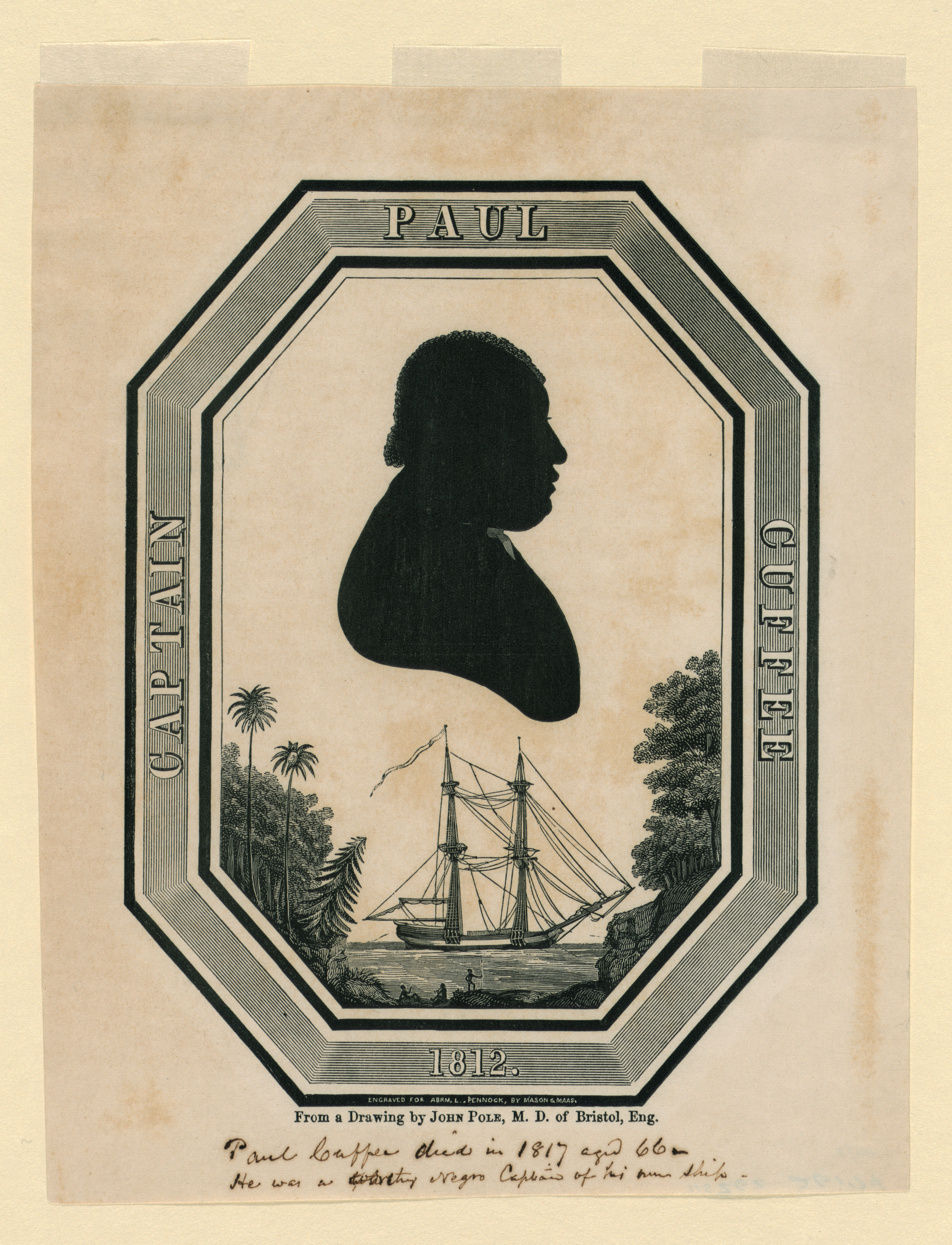
Engraving of Paul Cuffe over his ship, The Traveler.

At the peak of the whaling industry, the whaleship Omega housed around thirty men of color described as men with "wooly" hair. A whaleship typically had around 35 crew members. Black and indigenous men often made up a large portion of the whaling vessels in turn leading to the economic success of many captains. Whaling allowed many men of color to support their families and build generational wealth. The legacy of Paul Cuffe, a Black and Pequot man, was a legacy of wealth, success and status, where he was one of the most well known and wealthy Black man in the country, and his stepson, Pardon Cook, a Black and indigenous man was able to captain more voyages in the 1800s than any other Black or indigenous man. Whaling allowed for many Black and indigenous families to meet and have families with each other. The high demand of the whaling industry was because of the high demands of spermaceti candles, which New Englanders imported to the West Indies in support of the slave labor in order to pay off their debt to England after the Seven Years War. Black and indigenous whalers contributed labor, and wealth to the industry, funding the high demand of spermaceti candles, and slave labor in the West Indies. Black and Indigenous contributions to the whaling industry were present on the side of those producing, and those using the products of whaling.

=== Black and indigenous recruiting ===
Whaling merchants at the peak of whaling understood that many white Americans were not drawn to whaling, whether that be the conditions on board, or the opportunities elsewhere for work, so many merchants sought the labor of men who were willing to work the unappealing job of a whaleman. This led to many merchants and shipping agents to use the labor of black and indigenous men.

Black and indigenous men were more likely to accept the labor of whaling because of the economic prosperity that it granted, many black men would sell their shares because they were in immediate demand for money. Although recruiting was prominent many Black and indigenous men were drawn to the practice of whaling because of its ability to grant economic support. At 16 years old, Paul Cuffe went on his first whaling voyage in order to economically support his family. Many young men of color went on whaling voyages because of the wages that they granted which were particularly important for free black people to support themselves, and indigenous families to support themselves given that they were forced to participate in a market economy after American’s dispossessed many indigenous people of their land and removed their food sources.

Although many Black and indigenous people sought work on whaling vessels, there were several instances of coercion, where Black men were taken onboard as slaves, and indigenous men taken as indentured servants. Coercion took place in many forms, many times economically, where men were taken under accusations of debt. In 1799 The Pockentt brothers, two indigenous men in Cape Cod were taken by authorities as a punishment for alleged debt. Another example of indentured servitude was a man named Peter Wayamayahue, a Pequot man, who indentured himself on a whaling vessel then escaped his servitude by joining another vessel.

Overall, in the whaling industry, the need for labor overshadowed the majority of the racism involved with employment at the time. Many whaling agents and captains purposely employed men who had escaped from slavery, and many of these captains were Quakers and/or abolitionists. In 1769, Prince Boston, a man who had escaped from slavery found work on the whaleship Friendship, as the ship's captain, Elisha Folger, was a Quaker who knew of Boston's status. Quakers were instrumental in recruiting black men specifically. Crispus Attucks, the first person killed in the Boston Massacre, was a black man who escaped from slavery and found work on a whaling vessel before his death in 1770. Paul Cuffe, was a member of the Society of Friends and a whaling merchant who often employed all black crews.

One of the most prominent reasons why Black and indigenous men were able to find work on vessels was because of racial archetypes, which produced a narrative that Black men's purpose was for physical labor, and that Indigenous men were natural whalers, and natural harpooners. This was able to grant them work, but also played a role in many black and Indigenous men not being able to rise in the ranks of their lay.

=== Economics and status ===
Free black people needed money in order to sustain themselves; whaling was a great opportunity for income, but it was unreliable. The wealth received was dependent on the success of the crew, and the position of each member who got a share of the wage. Many black men started at the bottom of the ranks, as cooks, and servants because of racial stereotypes, but their need for income and the discrimination on land which barred them from other forms of income cemented their role on the whaling vessels.

Furthermore, many families could not wait years for their men to return home with money, and black and indigenous women built communities, and found ways to support their families financially, helping their husbands and sons in the industry. In the Boston-Higganbothom house in Nantucket, Black women supplemented their husband's income by creating boarding houses, where other Black or indigenous whalers were able to stay. This way Black women were able to create income, maintain their homes for their loved ones to return to, and build community with other whalers of color, and men of color would have a place to stay.

Indigenous men often were at a deficit of wealth; the legacy of land dispossession created a legacy of Indigenous whalers. In a recovered narrative of a Narragansett man who met his father on a whaling vessel, "Charles", a name used to protect his identity and acclimate into dominant culture, describes how his grandfather accumulated debt, and needed to sell land to Americans, weeding out the community of Narragansett people, leading them to find work at sea.

Although many Black men started at the lowest ranks of social status on whaling vessels, the nature of a vessel allowed them to prove their worth, and gain respect as people. A whaling vessel was one of the only places where a Black man could be called sir. Black men were able to return to their communities with titles of respect, with captain status. The close quarters with white men, and the conditions on a whaling vessel which required men to be a team allowed black and white men to form bonds which created a space somewhat free of discrimination.

== Discrimination ==
Many Black and indigenous whalers did not participate in the industry by choice, many were slaves and indentured servants. The Privateer in Rhode Island held four black mariners and three were enslaved. These men were often referred to with derogatory terms, one of the men was referred to exclusively with the term “Negro” in the nicknames "Captain's Negro Drummer" and "Negro Dick". Even when Black and indigenous men were in positions of power they were often ostracized from white life. An indigenous man, James W. DeGrass, was a second mate on the vessel Draco. On the vessel he was treated with respect from the shipmates and the captain, but when the opportunity to confer with other captains and second mates on land came, his captain would force him away. Black and indigenous men also experienced wage discrimination, barring them from earning their fair wages. Whaling merchants and ship owners would raise prices for whaling essentials. The "Seaman acts" were a group of laws requiring black sailors to stay on their ships or be arrested.

== Modern whaling ==
Whaling stations operated in Alaska and on the Canadian west coast. American Pacific Whaling Company, with headquarters in Victoria, British Columbia, operated ships and a plant in 1912 at Gray's Harbor, Washington with catcher ships ranging from the Canada–United States border south to Cape Blanco in Oregon. The economic success and profits were so high that the company decided to build new ships in 1913. At least one of the company's ships, Aberdeen is shown as active 1930 through 1945 with American Pacific Whaling Company in Lloyd's Register. Another company, West Coast Whaling Company, was organized in 1912 to operate out of Trinidad, California.

While whaling came to an end on the east coast in the early 20th-century, it lingered and even rebounded briefly on the west coast. A small shore-based whaling operation existed in San Francisco through the early 1970s. During the early 1960s, a small whaling fishery was developed near Astoria, Oregon as a collaboration between a local fishing family and the processing firm BioProducts. A single-ship operation was successful during the early 1960s, making a profit through sales of meat to local mink farms and whale oil to NASA. As synthetic oils came onto the markets, the demand for scientific grade whale oil was diminished and the operation came to a close about 1965. The whale processor has since refocused their operations on processing of other seafood oils and continues to operate today as BioOregon Protein.

== Native whaling in modern times ==
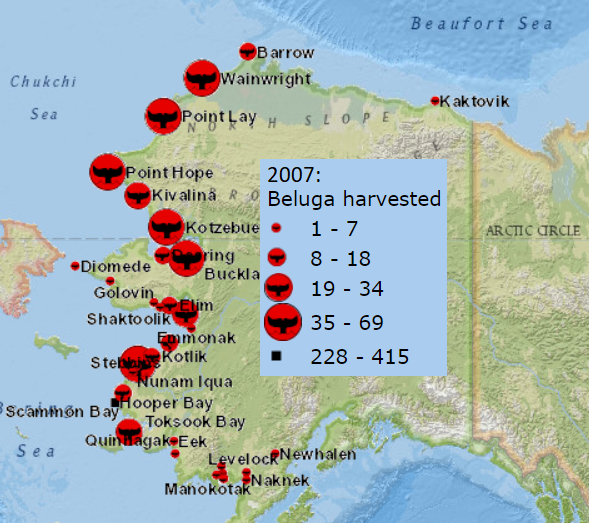
Alaska beluga harvest in 2007

In Alaska, bowhead whale and beluga whale hunts are regulated by the NMFS. In 2016 Alaskans caught 59 bowhead, two minke and one sperm whale; the latter two species were not authorized, though no one was prosecuted. IWC does not count belugas; Alaskans caught 326 belugas in 2015, monitored by the Alaska Beluga Whale Committee. The annual catch of beluga ranges between 300 and 500 per year and bowheads between 40 and 70 per year.

The 1855 Treaty of Neah Bay let Makah in Washington State hunt whales. Low stocks stopped them in the 1920s but recovered by the 1980s. In 1996 they sought an International Whaling Commission quota for nutritional subsistence, also known as aboriginal whaling. The industrial whaling countries of Japan and Norway supported them, but most countries did not, since Makah had lived without hunting for 70 years. In 1997 they argued whaling was "cultural 'glue' that holds the Tribe together" and received a quota, though countries worried about the precedent for other old whaling societies. In 2001, the United States government once again overturned its previous ruling and declared it illegal for the Makah to hunt whales. Makah, the United States, and environmental groups are still fighting legal battles.

== Scrimshaw art ==
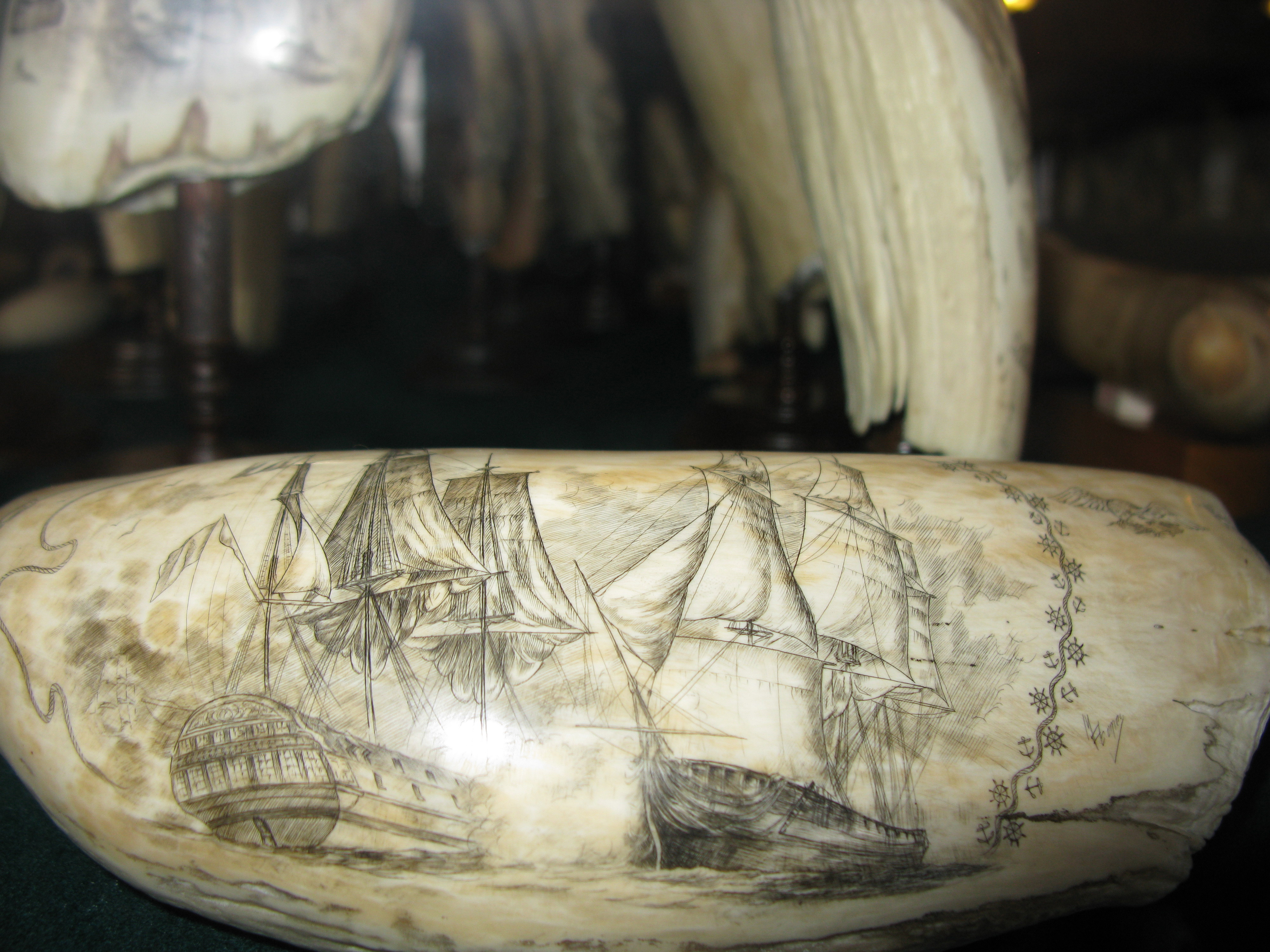
Detail on a piece in the Horta Scrimshaw Museum

A large number of crewmen on American, British, and other countries vessels that participated in whaling in the 19th century created scrimshaw. Scrimshaw is the practice of drawing on whale teeth or other forms of ivory with various tools, typically sailor's knives or other sharp instruments. These images were then coated with ink so that the drawing would appear more noticeable on the whale tooth. It is believed that some instruments used by sailors to perform scrimshaw included surgical tools, as with the work done by whaling surgeon William Lewis Roderick. Other forms of ivory included a whale's panbone, walrus ivory, and elephant ivory. Of course, the most common scrimshaw during the whaling period of the 19th century was made from whale parts.

Other forms of scrimshaw included whalebone fids (rope splicer), bodkins (needle), swifts (yarn holding equipment) and sailors' canes. The time when most scrimshaw in the 19th century was produced coincided with the heyday of the whaling industry which occurred between 1840–1860. More than 95% of all antique scrimshaw whale teeth known were done by anonymous artists. Some of the better known antique scrimshaw artists include Frederick Myrick and Edward Burdett, who were two of the first scrimshanders to ever sign and date their work. Several museums now house collections of antique scrimshaw, such as the New Bedford Whaling Museum in Massachusetts.

== See also ==
- Charles W. Morgan
- Cold Spring Harbor Whaling Museum
- Mystic Seaport
- New Bedford Whaling Museum
- New Bedford Whaling National Historical Park
- Whaling in the United Kingdom

== Bibliography ==
- Bockstoce, John (1986). Whales, Ice, & Men: The History of Whaling in the Western Arctic. University of Washington Press. ISBN 0-295-97447-8.
- Mawar, Granville (1999). Ahab's Trade: The Saga of South Seas Whaling. New York: St. Martin's Press. ISBN 0-312-22809-0.
- Robotti, Frances Diane (1952). Whaling and Old Salem. Bonanza Books.
- Scammon, Charles (1874). The Marine Mammals of the North-western Coast of North America: Together with an Account of the American Whale-fishery. Dover. ISBN 0-486-21976-3.
- Starbuck, Alexander (1878). History of the American Whale Fishery from Its Earliest Inception to the year 1876. Castle. ISBN 1-55521-537-8.
- Tower, W. S. (1907). A History of the American Whale Fishery. University of Philadelphia.
- Webb, Robert Lloyd (1988). On the Northwest: Commercial Whaling in the Pacific Northwest, 1790–1967. University of British Columbia Press. ISBN 0-7748-0292-8. LCCN 89156393.
