= Subsistence hunting of the bowhead whale =

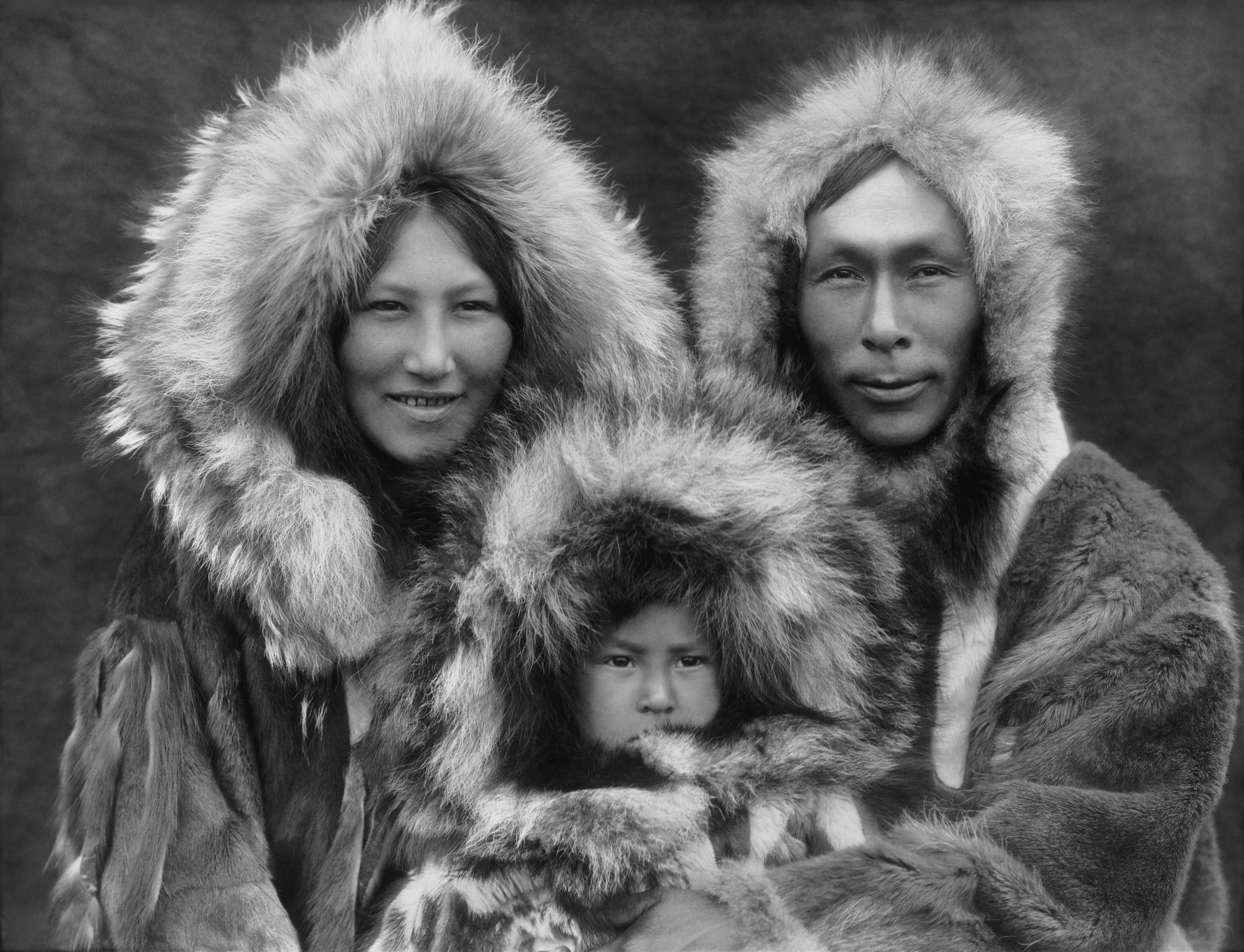
Iñupiat Family from Noatak, Alaska, 1929

Subsistence hunting of the bowhead whale is permitted by the International Whaling Commission, under limited conditions. While whaling is banned in most parts of the world, some of the Native peoples of North America, including the Inuit and Iñupiat peoples in Alaska, continue to hunt the Bowhead whale. Aboriginal whaling is valued for its contribution to food stocks (subsistence economy) and to cultural survival, although the days of commercial whaling in the United States and in Canada are over.

== Iñupiat ==
The bowhead whale is of great cultural significance to the Iñupiat in Utqiagvik, Alaska, who say that one cannot live without the other. According to the Iñupiat, the whale is the center of their diet, culture, and spirit. This makes them dependent on the complex system of sharing and celebrating the whale, and leads them to pray to any killed bowhead whale in thanks for the life it has given to them.

For the Iñupiat, subsistence hunting and fishing are important and viable economic strategies, which provide food and raw materials for the whole group. When hunters bring whales back to the community, about 65–70 people drag the whale onto the ice, where they work all day to harvest the meat. They work non-stop to prevent the whale's body heat from melting the ice too much. Afterwards, the captain and crew of the hunt invite the community to a celebratory meal. Once the captain has taken what he needs, he gives the rest of the whale away to his community and any others who need the food. However, despite its necessity, the interest in subsistence hunting has reduced among the youth in the tribes. Reasons for this decline include a lack of training, a lack of equipment, changing dietary preferences, a lack of interest, an increasing dependence upon wage employment, and interest in other activities (for example, basketball, hockey, and baseball).

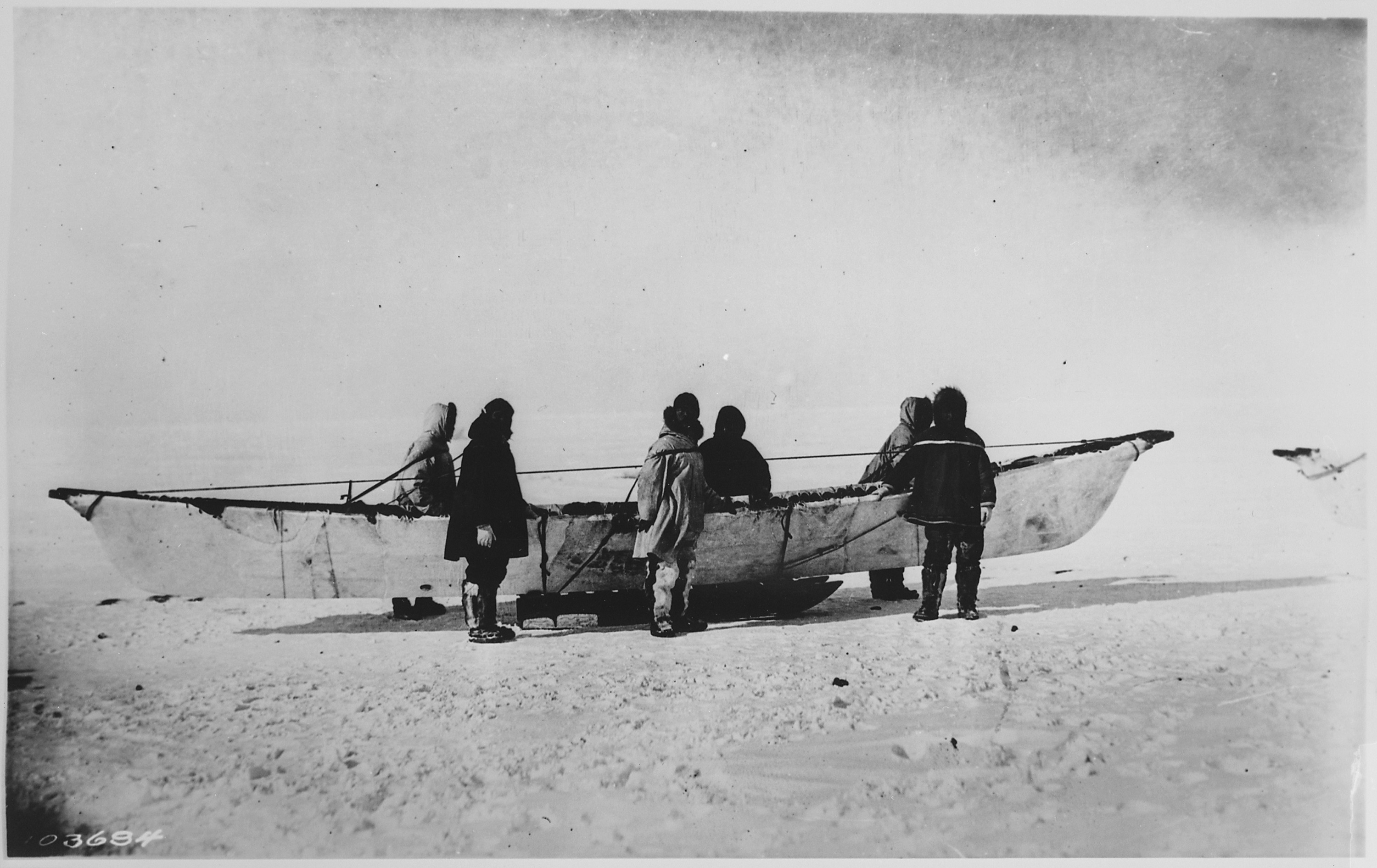
Inuit standing beside umiak on sled, Point Barrow, Alaska

Subsistence hunters take pride in what they do, because they see themselves as strong providers for their family and community. People within the Inuit community describe active hunters as follows "1) active hunters are always sharing meat with other people, 2) active hunters are always ready to go out hunting at a moment's notice, 3) active hunters travel at any time of year and not just during the spring, and 4) active hunters know more about travelling in cold weather and on the sea ice." On the way to the hunt, they travel by snowmobile across the ice until they find a safe campsite, which can sometimes take all day. The campsite must be near landlocked ice, so the hunters can move to the safety of solid ice in an emergency. Once on the hunt, they kill with harpoons and dart guns while sitting in their umiak (made from seal hide and part of a caribou).

Most nutrition is derived from the whale's meat and organs. According to the Iñupiat people, the whale's maktak, the thick black skin and attached oily blubber, contains body-warming energy and vitamin C. The whale's bones are used to frame sod iglus (igloo), and the elastic baleen is woven into baskets. The liver membrane is used for drums.

== Legal rights to tribes in Alaska ==
The problem of food security creates a need for laws on hunting in Alaska. Under the United Nations’ Food and Agriculture Association (FAO), food security is defined as the ability for an individual to "have physical and economic access to sufficient, safe and nutritious food to meet their dietary needs and food preferences for an active and healthy life."

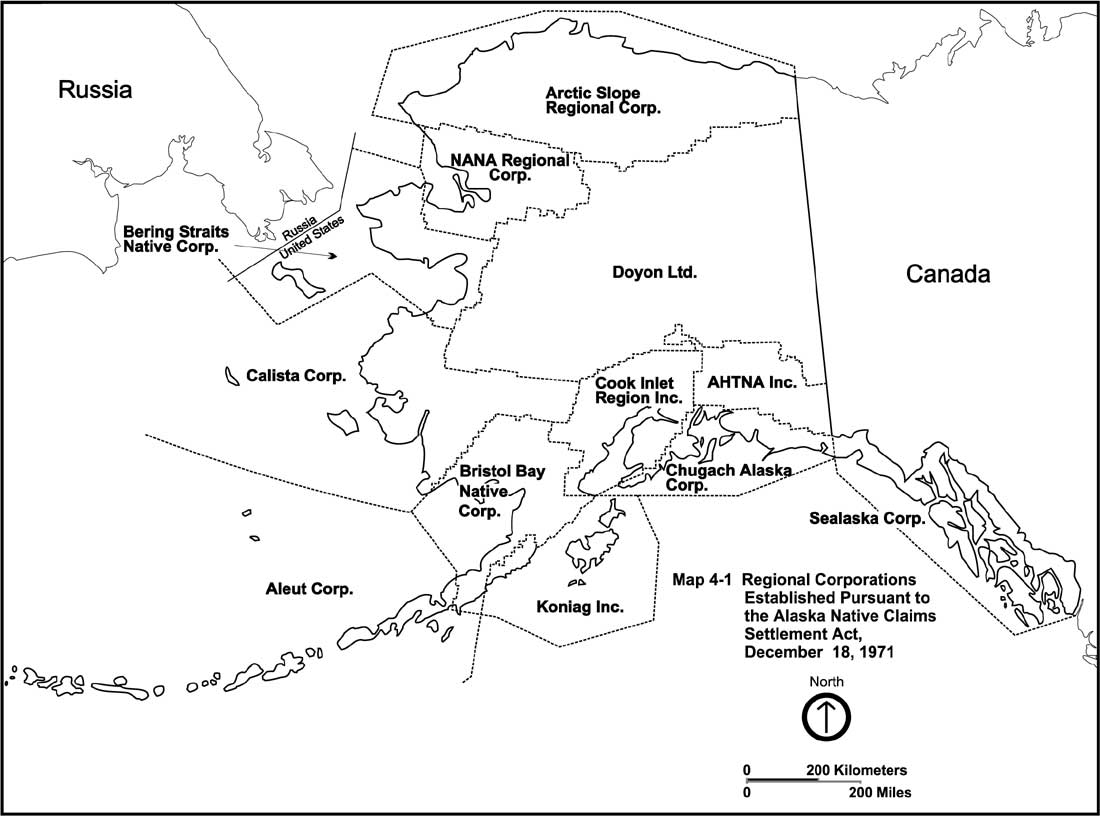
ANCSA Regional Corporations Map

Under this definition, Alaskans would be able to hunt the bowhead whale despite conservation efforts, which creates a need for official regulation. Congress enacted the Alaska Native Claims Settlement Act (ANCSA) in 1971, which removed "all aboriginal titles, if any, and claims of aboriginal title in Alaska based on use and occupancy, including submerged land underneath all water areas, both inland and offshore, and including any aboriginal hunting or fishing rights that may exist". The act also titled Natives with "44 million acres of Alaska and extinguished remaining claims with a $1 billion payment." Natives received compensation under this act, but it did not protect subsistence hunting. This led natives to look for exceptions in other laws, such as the Migratory Bird Treaty Act (MBTA), the Marine Mammal Protection Act of 1972 (MMPA), and the Endangered Species Act of 1973 (ESA).

In 1980, The Alaska National Interest Lands Conservation Act (ANILCA) was adapted to include subsidence hunting and fishing rights. This act gives up its rights to lands and fishing rights and gives them to Native Americans, Eskimos, or Aleuts for subsistence use. "ANILCA provides that Alaska may obtain subsistence jurisdiction of federal lands upon passage of a law providing for a similar subsistence priority for rural residents". The ANILCA also granted permanent protection to 104 million acres of federal land, including more than 40 million acres of parkland. Under ANILCA, Natives are allowed to substance hunt on seven new and expanded parks.

ANILCA governs subsistence for "rural residents", on federal lands, whereas state law governs subsistence for "all Alaskans", on state and private lands (including Native-owned ANCSA lands). Since both state and federal governments take care of Alaska's subsistence hunting laws, dual management between state and federal agencies is needed. This is currently guided by an Interim Memorandum of Agreement (MOA).

=== Natives and hunting licences ===
Permits are required to practise subsistence hunting in state of Alaska. The above laws allow for any resident of Alaska to apply for these permits. Because of this, many of the laws made for subsistence hunting fall in line with Alaska's normal hunting laws. A person under the age of sixteen must have completed a Basic Hunter Education course or be with someone over the age of sixteen who has. One can also be with an adult born no later than January 1, 1986. Permit applications must be submitted between November 1 and December 15 or they will be is discarded. Game for use as food in customary and traditional Alaska Native religious ceremonies may be hunted out of season and more than the allowed limits.

Permits are awarded to those who score highest on the application questions. Each application is scored on five questions, and permits for each hunt are given starting at the highest overall score and working downward until all permits have been given. Hunters may also apply for multiple permits (as separate applications), but can hold only one permit for each species of animal they wish to hunt. Permits cannot be transferred to another person, unless they are "active duty military personnel deployed to a combat zone who are unable to use their Tier II permit [who] may transfer their permit to a substitute hunter who is a resident of Alaska."

While hunting, one must carry the required permits, valid hunting licenses and, if appropriate, big game locking tags. At the end of the season all permits must be returned, regardless of use.

== Quotas ==
The IWC quota for hunting bowheads was 100 in 2020, with 7 for Russia and 93 for the United States. US hunters stuck 69 bowheads, of which they were able to bring 54 to land.

== In Arctic Canada ==
The Inuit have hunted whales long before European whaling ships showed up in the 1700s. From the 1940s they were forced to stop, but resumed in the 1990s. Only a few licenses are available each year. The hunt is monitored and co-managed by Nunavik Marine Regional Wildlife Board, the Nunavut Wildlife Management Board, and the Department of Fisheries and Oceans.

In 2024, the Inuit hunters of Aklavik, Northwest Territories were permitted to hunt and kill one bowhead whale with the whale meat to be distributed to Inuvialuit and Gwich'in communities in the region.
