= Periauger =

A periauger

A periauger or perogue (/pɪˈroʊg, ˈpiroʊg/) is a shallow draft, often flat-bottomed two-masted sailing vessel, often without a bowsprit, which also carried oars for rowing. Periaugers of varying sizes and designs were used extensively in the inland waterways of the eastern seaboard of the United States during the 18th to early 19th century.

The periauger was the type of sailing vessel used by Cornelius Vanderbilt to ply the waters of New York Harbor between Staten Island and lower Manhattan when he began his ferry service. Periaugers were the vessel of choice in the Hudson River. They were used as ferries, and to transport goods to and from the harbor of New York and the towns along the river until the first third of the 19th century. Replaced by steam boats, they all but vanished. The Dutch designs of the mid-Atlantic states, as opposed to the Southern dugout designs known as pirogues in Louisiana bayou country, were usually lapstrake construction, often using leeboards in lieu of a keel.

An account of the construction and use of the periauger was described by Englishman John Lawson (1674?–1711) an explorer, naturalist and writer, on his travels in 1701 in what is today, South Carolina. The account was published in his diaries in 1709.

The next day we entered Santee river's mouth, . . . As we row'd up the river, we found the land towards the mouth, and for about sixteen miles up it, scarce any thing but swamp and percoarson, affording vast ciprus-trees, of which the French make canoes, that will carry fifty or sixty barrels. After the tree is moulded and dug, they saw them in two pieces and so put a plank between, and even a small Keel, to preserve them from the Oyster-Banks, which are innumerable in the Creeks and Bays betwixt the French settlement and Charles-Town.
They carry two masts and Bermudas sails, which makes them very handy and fit for their purpose; . . . . Of these great trees the pereaugers and canoes are scoop'd and made; which sort of vessels are chiefly to pass over the rivers, creeks, and bays; and to transport goods and lumber from one river to another. Some are so large as to carry thirty barrels, tho' of one entire piece of timber. Others that are split down the bottom, and a piece added thereto, will carry eighty, or an hundred. Several have gone out our inlets on the ocean to Virginia, laden with pork, and other produce of the country. Of these trees curious boats for pleasure may be made, and other necessary craft.... This wood is very lasting, and free from the rot. A canoe of it will outlast four boats, and seldom wants repair.
