= Yuquot Whalers' Shrine =

Collection of carved figures previously serving as a Yuquot ritual site

Coordinates: 49.597197°N 126.628201°W

Photograph of the Shrine by George Hunt c. 1904

The Yuquot Whalers' Shrine (known also as 'prayer house' or 'washing house'), previously located on Vancouver Island, British Columbia, was a site of purification rituals, passed down through the family of a Yuquot chief. It contained a collection of 88 carved human figures, 4 carved whale figures, and 16 human skulls. Since the early twentieth century, it had been in the possession of the American Museum of Natural History in New York City but was rarely displayed. It has since been returned to the Mowachaht/Muchalaht tribe.

== Description ==
The Shrine was first described in first-hand accounts in 1785 by early Western explorers as a Nootka (Nuu-chah-nulth) ceremonial site; the actual origin of the Shrine is unclear. Anthropologist Aldona Jonaitis believes that a text of Camille de Roquefeuil written in 1818 provides the first conclusive evidence of the Shrine's existence from the perspective of multiple people. Rituals performed at the Shrine are of some contention, with more recent texts from anthropologists Franz Boas and Philip Drucker describing the ritual as involving the use of skulls or corpses that do not appear in the earlier French texts of de Roquefeuil and his ship's surgeon Yves-Thomas Vimont. What is known is that it was of considerable importance given the Nuu-chah-nulth's long history of whaling, going back at least 4000 years.

== Removal ==
It has been suggested that it was late in the winter canning season of 1900/early 1901 that George Hunt, a Tlingit-English ethnographer, learned of this 'mysterious' Shrine in the forest near Yuquot. Hunt initiated communications with Franz Boas in 1903 about the existence of the Shrine, photographing it meticulously to gauge his interest; Boas was excited to purchase it on behalf of his employer, the American Museum of Natural History. Two elders claimed they had power to give permission to remove the Shrine, and Hunt negotiated a price with both of them with the condition that he was to wait until the band left for the hunt before removing the Shrine, as they feared a backlash. It was in 1904 that the Shrine was moved to the AMNH where it remained until its return in 2025.

== Franz Boas, George Hunt, and Salvage Anthropology ==
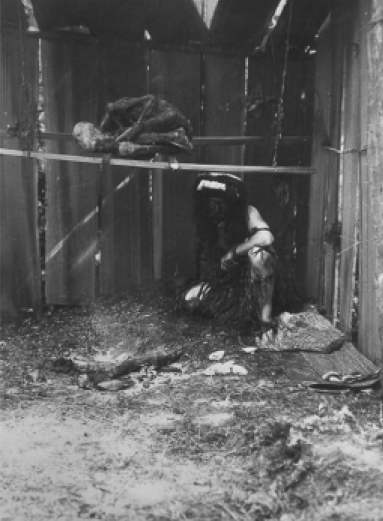
Photo of George Hunt taken by Edward Curtis c.1910. "Hamatsa Initiate in his Hut - Kwakiutl"

George Hunt, upon removal of the Shrine, wrote to Boas to tell him, "It was the best thing I ever bought from the Indians". For Boas, the acquisition of the Whalers' Shrine became a defining 'historical moment', and marked a new direction in his 'new found obsession' with regard to the museum, its collections, and displays.

Anthropologist Harry Whitehead has been especially outspoken about the methods used by George Hunt and Franz Boas in acquiring artefacts (and specifically the Whalers' Shrine). He believes that they contributed significantly to the perpetuation of salvage anthropology through their frequent collection and cataloguing of First Nations or American Indian objects. Whitehead says that in an attempt to save artefacts of the Nuu-chah-nulth before they 'disappeared', they accelerated the destruction of their 'traditional culture'. Furthermore, their public display and photographs of the artefacts collected prompted others to follow suit in collecting for their own institutions, which exacerbated the situation and led to years of misrepresentation of many groups of people and artefacts taken under false pretences.

Aaron Glass, anthropologist of the Northwest Coast, has said that Hunt and Boas directly influenced photographers and anthropologists looking to capture Nuu-chah-nulth culture before it 'disappeared', continuing the practice of salvage ethnography and anthropology. He writes that photographer Edward Curtis (spurred on by Hunt's photographs to make his own of the Nuu-chah-nulth) was interventionist in his work and added things for visual effect and interest, encouraging the romanticizing of a 'lost culture' typical of salvage ethnography. George Hunt himself, under disguise, posed as a member of the Nuu-chah-nulth to demonstrate his interpretation of certain ceremonies in 1910 for Curtis' camera. The photograph is not of George Hunt falsely acting out a Nuu-chah-nulth initiation at all; George is acting out a Kwakiutl ceremony on the East coast of Vancouver Island which he was familiar with.

== Repatriation ==
The repatriation of the Shrine and its contents were mired by extenuating and complicating circumstances. Canada does not presently have legislation in governing repatriation; however, museums act as caretakers on a case-by-case basis. In the United States, the Native American Graves Protection and Repatriation Act (NAGPRA) requires Native American cultural items to be returned to 'lineal descendants'. The current discourse of the Shrine is to build a community centre that would house the Shrine, or build a replica of the Shrine. Jonaitas explains, however, that there needs to be a more 'nuanced' view and understanding of how historical events occurring, both before and after the acquisition, have presented challenges as to how to repatriate in light of loss of ceremonial rituals and traditions surrounding the handling of such sacred items. The repatriation of the Whalers' Shrine was the subject of a 1994 documentary entitled 'Washing of Tears' by filmmaker and anthropologist, Hugh Brody.

As of April 2025, the Yuquot Whaler's Shrine has been returned to the Mowachaht/Muchalaht. Repatriation was made official on the 25th of March, 2025, and there are currently no plans to have the artifacts on public display.

== Heritage Value ==
Canada has designated the Whalers' Shrine Site as a national historic site since 1983.

== See also ==
- Maquinna
