= List of ships built by Hall, Russell & Company (501–600) =

List of ships built by Aberdeen shipbuilders Hall, Russell & Company, from yard number 501 to 600.

The ships built in the sequence 501 to 600 cover the period 1911 to 1917. The vessels built during this period are typically armed trawlers and smaller naval vessels for the Admiralty.

List of Hall, Russell & Company built ships (501–600)
| Name | Image | Yard Number | Construction | Type | Year | Length Overall | Breadth | Depth | Tonnage | Ref(s) |
|---|---|---|---|---|---|---|---|---|---|---|
| Isabella Fowlie | | 501 | Steel | Trawler - Steam | 1911 | 115 feet 2 inches (35.10 m) | 22 feet 1 inch (6.73 m) | 11 feet 9 inches (3.58 m) | 196 long tons (199 t) | |
| Thomas W. Irvin | | 502 | | Trawler - Steam | 1911 | 115 feet 3 inches (35.13 m) | 22 feet 1 inch (6.73 m) | 12 feet 9 inches (3.89 m) | 201 long tons (204 t) | |
| James Pitchers | | 503 | | Trawler - Steam | 1911 | 115 feet 3 inches (35.13 m) | 22 feet 1 inch (6.73 m) | 12 feet 9 inches (3.89 m) | 197 long tons (200 t) | |
| Raindrop | | 504 | Steel | Trawler - Steam | 1912 | 105 feet 4 inches (32.11 m) | 21 feet 2 inches (6.45 m) | 11 feet 6 inches (3.51 m) | 167 long tons (170 t) | |
| Koorhah | | 505 | Steel | Trawler - Steam | 1912 | 117 feet 4 inches (35.76 m) | 22 feet 6 inches (6.86 m) | 12 feet 2 inches (3.71 m) | 227 long tons (231 t) | |
| Shandwick | | 506 | Steel | Trawler - Steam | 1912 | 105 feet 5 inches (32.13 m) | 21 feet 2 inches (6.45 m) | 11 feet 6 inches (3.51 m) | 166 long tons (169 t) | |
| Nordby | | 507 | Steel | Cargo Steamer | 1913 | 155 feet 6 inches (47.40 m) | 26 feet 1 inch (7.95 m) | 12 feet 3 inches (3.73 m) | 476 long tons (484 t) | |
| Star of the Isles | | 508 | Steel | Trawler - Steam | 1912 | 115 feet 5 inches (35.18 m) | 22 feet 6 inches (6.86 m) | 12 feet 9 inches (3.89 m) | 217 long tons (220 t) | |
| Star of the East | | 509 | Steel | Trawler - Steam | 1912 | 115 feet 6 inches (35.20 m) | 22 feet 6 inches (6.86 m) | 12 feet 9 inches (3.89 m) | 218 long tons (221 t) | |
| Kupa | | 510 | Steel | Passenger and Cargo | 1912 | 195 feet 6 inches (59.59 m) | 21 feet 1 inch (6.43 m) | 14 feet (4.3 m) | 790 long tons (800 t) | |
| John T. Graham | | 511 | Steel | Trawler - Steam | 1912 | 113 feet (34 m) | 21 feet 1 inch (6.43 m) | 11 feet 8 inches (3.56 m) | 198 long tons (201 t) | |
| Ben Heilem | | 512 | | Trawler - Steam | 1912 | 115 feet 3 inches (35.13 m) | 22 feet 1 inch (6.73 m) | 12 feet 9 inches (3.89 m) | 196 long tons (199 t) | |
| Ben Asdale | | 513 | Steel | Trawler - Steam | 1912 | 115 feet (35 m) | 22 feet 1 inch (6.73 m) | 11 feet 9 inches (3.58 m) | 198 long tons (201 t) | |
| Ben Tarbert | | 514 | Steel | Trawler - Steam | 1912 | 115 feet 4 inches (35.15 m) | 22 feet 1 inch (6.73 m) | 11 feet 9 inches (3.58 m) | 197 long tons (200 t) | |
| Strathatholl | | 515 | Steel | Trawler - Steam | 1912 | 115 feet 2 inches (35.10 m) | 22 feet 1 inch (6.73 m) | 12 feet 2 inches (3.71 m) | 209 long tons (212 t) | |
| Strathmoray | | 516 | | Trawler - Steam | 1912 | 115 feet 3 inches (35.13 m) | 22 feet 1 inch (6.73 m) | 13 feet (4.0 m) | 209 long tons (212 t) | |
| Kerdonis | | 517 | Steel | Trawler - Steam | 1912 | 120 feet 3 inches (36.65 m) | 23 feet 1 inch (7.04 m) | 12 feet 2 inches (3.71 m) | 247 long tons (251 t) | |
| Granton N.B. | | 518 | Steel | Trawler - Steam | 1913 | 110 feet 1 inch (33.55 m) | 21 feet 8 inches (6.60 m) | 11 feet 7 inches (3.53 m) | 180 long tons (180 t) | |
| Norah Elsmie | | 519 | Steel | Cargo Steamer | 1912 | 155 feet 3 inches (47.32 m) | 25 feet 1 inch (7.65 m) | 10 feet 7 inches (3.23 m) | 424 long tons (431 t) | |
| Braeneil | | 520 | | Cargo Steamer | 1912 | 155 feet 5 inches (47.37 m) | 25 feet 1 inch (7.65 m) | 12 feet (3.7 m) | 424 long tons (431 t) | |
| Star of the Empire | | 521 | Steel | Trawler - Steam | 1912 | 115 feet 3 inches (35.13 m) | 22 feet 6 inches (6.86 m) | 13 feet (4.0 m) | 219 long tons (223 t) | |
| Ben Ardna | | 522 | Steel | Trawler - Steam | 1913 | 115 feet (35 m) | 22 feet (6.7 m) | 12 feet 9 inches (3.89 m) | 197 long tons (200 t) | |
| Marthe | | 523 | Steel | Trawler - Steam | 1913 | 130 feet 3 inches (39.70 m) | 22 feet 1 inch (6.73 m) | 12 feet 4 inches (3.76 m) | 262 long tons (266 t) | |
| Ugiebank | | 524 | Steel | Trawler - Steam | 1913 | 117 feet 3 inches (35.74 m) | 22 feet (6.7 m) | 12 feet 2 inches (3.71 m) | 205 long tons (208 t) | |
| Strathafton | | 525 | Steel | Trawler - Steam | 1913 | 115 feet 3 inches (35.13 m) | 22 feet 1 inch (6.73 m) | 12 feet 2 inches (3.71 m) | 209 long tons (212 t) | |
| Strathcarron | | 526 | Steel | Trawler - Steam | 1913 | 115 feet 3 inches (35.13 m) | 22 feet 1 inch (6.73 m) | 12 feet 2 inches (3.71 m) | 209 long tons (212 t) | |
| Strathnethy | | 527 | Steel | Trawler - Steam | 1913 | 115 feet 8 inches (35.26 m) | 22 feet 1 inch (6.73 m) | 12 feet 2 inches (3.71 m) | 211 long tons (214 t) | |
| Strathclune | | 528 | | Trawler - Steam | 1913 | 115 feet 4 inches (35.15 m) | 22 feet 1 inch (6.73 m) | 13 feet (4.0 m) | 211 long tons (214 t) | |
| South Bulli | | 529 | Steel | Cargo - Collier (Coal) | 1913 | 195 feet 1 inch (59.46 m) | 30 feet 3 inches (9.22 m) | 12 feet 6 inches (3.81 m) | 818 long tons (831 t) | |
| Woniora | | 530 | Steel | Cargo - Collier (Coal) | 1913 | 195 feet (59 m) | 30 feet 3 inches (9.22 m) | 12 feet 6 inches (3.81 m) | 823 long tons (836 t) | |
| Sparta | | 531 | Steel | Passenger and Cargo | 1913 | 215 feet 7 inches (65.71 m) | 30 feet 6 inches (9.30 m) | 14 feet (4.3 m) | 982 long tons (998 t) | |
| Zealous | | 532 | Steel | Tanker - Water (Royal Navy Auxiliary) | 1913 | 110 feet 3 inches (33.60 m) | 23 feet (7.0 m) | 11 feet 9 inches (3.58 m) | 205 long tons (208 t) | |
| Strathella | | 533 | Steel | Trawler - Steam | 1914 | 115 feet 8 inches (35.26 m) | 22 feet 1 inch (6.73 m) | 12 feet 2 inches (3.71 m) | 210 long tons (210 t) | |
| Strathclova | | 534 | Steel | Trawler - Steam | 1914 | 115 feet 8 inches (35.26 m) | 22 feet 1 inch (6.73 m) | 12 feet 2 inches (3.71 m) | 210 long tons (210 t) | |
| John H. Irvin | | 535 | Steel | Trawler - Steam | 1913 | 115 feet 3 inches (35.13 m) | 22 feet 1 inch (6.73 m) | 12 feet 9 inches (3.89 m) | 199 long tons (202 t) | |
| Ben Lora | | 536 | Steel | Trawler - Steam | 1913 | 115 feet 4 inches (35.15 m) | 22 feet 1 inch (6.73 m) | 12 feet (3.7 m) | 197 long tons (200 t) | |
| Nairana | | 537 | Steel | Trawler - Steam | 1913 | 117 feet 8 inches (35.86 m) | 22 feet 5 inches (6.83 m) | 14 feet 6 inches (4.42 m) | 225 long tons (229 t) | |
| Ben Iver | | 538 | Steel | Trawler - Steam | 1914 | 115 feet 6 inches (35.20 m) | 22 feet 1 inch (6.73 m) | 12 feet (3.7 m) | 197 long tons (200 t) | |
| Ben Torc | | 539 | Steel | Trawler - Steam | 1914 | 115 feet 8 inches (35.26 m) | 22 feet 1 inch (6.73 m) | 12 feet (3.7 m) | 199 long tons (202 t) | |
| W.H. Podd | | 540 | Steel | Trawler - Steam | 1914 | 117 feet 5 inches (35.79 m) | 22 feet 5 inches (6.83 m) | 12 feet 1 inch (3.68 m) | 225 long tons (229 t) | |
| Strathmartin | | 541 | Steel | Trawler - Steam | 1914 | 115 feet 5 inches (35.18 m) | 22 feet 1 inch (6.73 m) | 12 feet 1 inch (3.68 m) | 210 long tons (210 t) | |
| Strathmaree | | 542 | Steel | Trawler - Steam | 1914 | 115 feet 5 inches (35.18 m) | 22 feet 1 inch (6.73 m) | 12 feet 1 inch (3.68 m) | 210 long tons (210 t) | |
| Strathugie | | 543 | Steel | Trawler - Steam | 1914 | 115 feet 5 inches (35.18 m) | 22 feet 1 inch (6.73 m) | 12 feet 1 inch (3.68 m) | 210 long tons (210 t) | |
| Strathebrie | | 544 | Steel | Trawler - Steam | 1914 | 115 feet 5 inches (35.18 m) | 22 feet 1 inch (6.73 m) | 12 feet 1 inch (3.68 m) | 210 long tons (210 t) | |
| Ben Chourn | | 545 | Steel | Trawler - Steam | 1914 | 115 feet 4 inches (35.15 m) | 22 feet 1 inch (6.73 m) | 12 feet (3.7 m) | 197 long tons (200 t) | |
| Ben Holden | | 546 | Steel | Trawler - Steam | 1914 | 115 feet 4 inches (35.15 m) | 22 feet 1 inch (6.73 m) | 12 feet (3.7 m) | 197 long tons (200 t) | |
| James B. Graham | | 547 | Steel | Trawler - Steam | 1914 | 115 feet 4 inches (35.15 m) | 22 feet 1 inch (6.73 m) | 12 feet 9 inches (3.89 m) | 198 long tons (201 t) | |
| Whinhill | | 548 | Steel | Cargo Steamer | 1914 | 165 feet 5 inches (50.42 m) | 25 feet 2 inches (7.67 m) | 9 feet 7 inches (2.92 m) | 478 long tons (486 t) | |
| Doris Burton | | 549 | Steel | Trawler - Steam | 1914 | 115 feet 4 inches (35.15 m) | 22 feet 1 inch (6.73 m) | 11 feet 9 inches (3.58 m) | 197 long tons (200 t) | |
| Miriam Stewart | | 550 | Steel | Trawler - Steam | 1914 | 115 feet 4 inches (35.15 m) | 22 feet 1 inch (6.73 m) | 11 feet 9 inches (3.58 m) | 197 long tons (200 t) | |
| Noogana | | 551 | Steel | Trawler - Steam | 1914 | 120 feet 9 inches (36.80 m) | 22 feet 7 inches (6.88 m) | 12 feet 1 inch (3.68 m) | 237 long tons (241 t) | |
| Kinaldie | | 552 | Steel | Trawler - Steam | 1914 | 115 feet 3 inches (35.13 m) | 22 feet 1 inch (6.73 m) | 11 feet 9 inches (3.58 m) | 197 long tons (200 t) | |
| Ben Strome | | 553 | Steel | Trawler - Steam | 1914 | 115 feet 5 inches (35.18 m) | 22 feet 1 inch (6.73 m) | 11 feet 9 inches (3.58 m) | 198 long tons (201 t) | |
| Ben Barvas | | 554 | Steel | Trawler - Steam | 1914 | 115 feet 5 inches (35.18 m) | 22 feet 1 inch (6.73 m) | 11 feet 9 inches (3.58 m) | 198 long tons (201 t) | |
| Ben Glamair | | 554 | Steel | Trawler - Steam | 1914 | 115 feet 5 inches (35.18 m) | 22 feet 1 inch (6.73 m) | 11 feet 9 inches (3.58 m) | 198 long tons (201 t) | |
| Trinity N.B. | | 555 | Steel | Trawler - Steam | 1914 | 115 feet 5 inches (35.18 m) | 22 feet 1 inch (6.73 m) | 12 feet 2 inches (3.71 m) | 203 long tons (206 t) | |
| Leith N.B. | | 556 | Steel | Trawler - Steam | 1914 | 115 feet 5 inches (35.18 m) | 22 feet 2 inches (6.76 m) | 12 feet 2 inches (3.71 m) | 203 long tons (206 t) | |
| Ben Gulvain | | 557 | Steel | Trawler - Steam | 1914 | 115 feet 3 inches (35.13 m) | 22 feet 1 inch (6.73 m) | 11 feet 9 inches (3.58 m) | 197 long tons (200 t) | |
| Ben Screel | | 558 | Steel | Trawler - Steam | 1914 | 115 feet 4 inches (35.15 m) | 22 feet 1 inch (6.73 m) | 11 feet 9 inches (3.58 m) | 197 long tons (200 t) | |
| Kathleen Burton | | 558 | Steel | Trawler - Steam | 1914 | 115 feet 4 inches (35.15 m) | 22 feet 1 inch (6.73 m) | 11 feet 9 inches (3.58 m) | 197 long tons (200 t) | |
| William Allan | | 559 | Steel | Trawler - Steam | 1914 | 115 feet 3 inches (35.13 m) | 22 feet 1 inch (6.73 m) | 11 feet 8 inches (3.56 m) | 203 long tons (206 t) | |
| Marguerite | | 560 | Steel | Trawler - Steam | 1915 | 115 feet 4 inches (35.15 m) | 22 feet 1 inch (6.73 m) | 11 feet 9 inches (3.58 m) | 193 long tons (196 t) | |
| Octoroon | | 561 | Steel | Trawler - Steam | 1914 | 115 feet 4 inches (35.15 m) | 22 feet 1 inch (6.73 m) | 11 feet 9 inches (3.58 m) | 195 long tons (198 t) | |
| Gertrude Cappleman | | 562 | Steel | Trawler - Steam | 1915 | 115 feet 3 inches (35.13 m) | 22 feet 1 inch (6.73 m) | 11 feet 9 inches (3.58 m) | 195 long tons (198 t) | |
| Agnes Nutten | | 563 | Steel | Trawler - Steam | 1915 | 110 feet 3 inches (33.60 m) | 21 feet 8 inches (6.60 m) | 11 feet 7 inches (3.53 m) | 183 long tons (186 t) | |
| Strathelliot | | 564 | Steel | Trawler - Steam | 1915 | 115 feet 6 inches (35.20 m) | 22 feet 2 inches (6.76 m) | 12 feet 2 inches (3.71 m) | 211 long tons (214 t) | |
| Strathgairn | | 565 | Steel | Trawler - Steam | 1915 | 115 feet 6 inches (35.20 m) | 22 feet 2 inches (6.76 m) | 12 feet 2 inches (3.71 m) | 211 long tons (214 t) | |
| Eveline Nutten | | 566 | Steel | Trawler - Steam | 1915 | 110 feet 3 inches (33.60 m) | 21 feet 8 inches (6.60 m) | 11 feet 7 inches (3.53 m) | 183 long tons (186 t) | |
| Jaboo II | | 567 | Steel | Trawler - Steam | 1915 | 120 feet 7 inches (36.75 m) | 22 feet 6 inches (6.86 m) | 12 feet (3.7 m) | 236 long tons (240 t) | |
| Ocean Scout I | | 568 | | Trawler - Steam | 1915 | 115 feet 3 inches (35.13 m) | 22 feet 1 inch (6.73 m) | 13 feet (4.0 m) | 200 long tons (200 t) | |
| Abergeldie | | 569 | Steel | Trawler - Steam | 1915 | 115 feet 7 inches (35.23 m) | 22 feet (6.7 m) | 12 feet 1 inch (3.68 m) | 200 long tons (200 t) | |
| Theresa Boyle | | 570 | Steel | Trawler - Steam | 1915 | 120 feet 7 inches (36.75 m) | 22 feet 7 inches (6.88 m) | 12 feet 2 inches (3.71 m) | 224 long tons (228 t) | |
| Glenboyne | | 571 | | Trawler - Steam | 1915 | 120 feet 4 inches (36.68 m) | 22 feet 7 inches (6.88 m) | 13 feet (4.0 m) | 224 long tons (228 t) | |
| Glenbervie | | 572 | Steel | Trawler - Steam | 1915 | 120 feet 7 inches (36.75 m) | 22 feet 7 inches (6.88 m) | 12 feet 2 inches (3.71 m) | 224 long tons (228 t) | |
| Star of Peace | | 573 | | Trawler - Steam | 1915 | 120 feet 4 inches (36.68 m) | 22 feet 7 inches (6.88 m) | 13 feet (4.0 m) | 220 long tons (220 t) | |
| Strathbran | | 574 | Steel | Trawler - Steam | 1915 | 115 feet 3 inches (35.13 m) | 22 feet 1 inch (6.73 m) | 13 feet (4.0 m) | 212 long tons (215 t) | |
| Strathdevon | | 575 | Steel | Trawler - Steam | 1915 | 115 feet 7 inches (35.23 m) | 22 feet 3 inches (6.78 m) | 12 feet 1 inch (3.68 m) | 212 long tons (215 t) | |
| Strathlochy | | 576 | Steel | Trawler - Steam | 1916 | 115 feet 7 inches (35.23 m) | 22 feet 3 inches (6.78 m) | 12 feet 1 inch (3.68 m) | 212 long tons (215 t) | |
| Strathrye | | 577 | Steel | Trawler - Steam | 1916 | 115 feet 7 inches (35.23 m) | 22 feet 3 inches (6.78 m) | 12 feet 1 inch (3.68 m) | 212 long tons (215 t) | |
| Thomas W. Irvin | | 578 | Steel | Trawler - Steam | 1916 | 115 feet 4 inches (35.15 m) | 22 feet 1 inch (6.73 m) | 11 feet 9 inches (3.58 m) | 209 long tons (212 t) | |
| George Scott | | 579 | Steel | Trawler - Steam | 1916 | 115 feet 4 inches (35.15 m) | 22 feet 1 inch (6.73 m) | 11 feet 9 inches (3.58 m) | 209 long tons (212 t) | |
| George Milburn | | 580 | | Trawler - Steam | 1916 | 122 feet 4 inches (37.29 m) | 22 feet 1 inch (6.73 m) | 13 feet 3 inches (4.04 m) | 228 long tons (232 t) | |
| D.W. Fitzgerald | | 581 | Steel | Trawler - Steam | 1916 | 122 feet 5 inches (37.31 m) | 22 feet 2 inches (6.76 m) | 14 feet (4.3 m) | 235 long tons (239 t) | |
| Parkmore | | 582 | Steel | Trawler - Steam | 1915 | 115 feet 3 inches (35.13 m) | 22 feet 1 inch (6.73 m) | 12 feet 9 inches (3.89 m) | 199 long tons (202 t) | |
| R.H. Davison | | 583 | Steel | Trawler - Steam | 1916 | 115 feet 7 inches (35.23 m) | 22 feet 4 inches (6.81 m) | 12 feet 9 inches (3.89 m) | 210 long tons (210 t) | |
| Jeanie Stewart | | 584 | | Trawler - Steam | 1916 | 115 feet 3 inches (35.13 m) | 22 feet 1 inch (6.73 m) | 12 feet 9 inches (3.89 m) | 210 long tons (210 t) | |
| Craigmore | | 585 | | Trawler - Steam | 1916 | 115 feet 3 inches (35.13 m) | 22 feet 1 inch (6.73 m) | 12 feet 9 inches (3.89 m) | 210 long tons (210 t) | |
| Ben Bhrackie | | 586 | Steel | Trawler - Steam | 1916 | 122 feet 6 inches (37.34 m) | 22 feet 2 inches (6.76 m) | 12 feet 3 inches (3.73 m) | 235 long tons (239 t) | |
| Ben Breac | | 587 | Steel | Trawler - Steam | 1916 | 122 feet 6 inches (37.34 m) | 22 feet 2 inches (6.76 m) | 12 feet 3 inches (3.73 m) | 235 long tons (239 t) | |
| John G. Watson | | 588 | | Trawler - Steam | 1916 | 122 feet 4 inches (37.29 m) | 22 feet 1 inch (6.73 m) | 13 feet 3 inches (4.04 m) | 235 long tons (239 t) | |
| Ben Earn | | 589 | Steel | Trawler - Steam | 1916 | 122 feet 4 inches (37.29 m) | 22 feet 1 inch (6.73 m) | 13 feet 3 inches (4.04 m) | 235 long tons (239 t) | |
| Ben Gairn | | 590 | Steel | Trawler - Steam | 1916 | 122 feet 4 inches (37.29 m) | 22 feet 1 inch (6.73 m) | 13 feet 3 inches (4.04 m) | 204 long tons (207 t) | |
| Ben Urie | | 591 | Steel | Trawler - Steam | 1916 | 122 feet 5 inches (37.31 m) | 22 feet 1 inch (6.73 m) | 13 feet 3 inches (4.04 m) | 234 long tons (238 t) | |
| Strathcoe | | 592 | Steel | Trawler - Steam | 1916 | 117 feet 3 inches (35.74 m) | 22 feet 1 inch (6.73 m) | 13 feet (4.0 m) | 215 long tons (218 t) | |
| Strathrannoch | | 593 | Steel | Trawler - Steam | 1917 | 117 feet 3 inches (35.74 m) | 22 feet 1 inch (6.73 m) | 13 feet (4.0 m) | 215 long tons (218 t) | |
| Strathlee | | 594 | Steel | Trawler - Steam | 1917 | 117 feet 3 inches (35.74 m) | 22 feet 1 inch (6.73 m) | 13 feet (4.0 m) | 215 long tons (218 t) | |
| Strathalva | | 595 | Steel | Trawler - Steam | 1917 | 117 feet 3 inches (35.74 m) | 22 feet 1 inch (6.73 m) | 13 feet (4.0 m) | 215 long tons (218 t) | |
| W.S. Burton | | 596 | Steel | Trawler - Steam | 1917 | 122 feet 4 inches (37.29 m) | 22 feet 1 inch (6.73 m) | 13 feet 3 inches (4.04 m) | 234 long tons (238 t) | |
| Ben Glas | | 597 | Steel | Trawler - Steam | 1917 | 122 feet 4 inches (37.29 m) | 22 feet 1 inch (6.73 m) | 13 feet 3 inches (4.04 m) | 234 long tons (238 t) | |
| Ben Meidie | | 598 | Steel | Trawler - Steam | 1917 | 122 feet 4 inches (37.29 m) | 22 feet 1 inch (6.73 m) | 13 feet 3 inches (4.04 m) | 234 long tons (238 t) | |
| Redhall | | 599 | Steel | Cargo - Collier (Coal) | 1917 | 221 feet (67 m) | 33 feet 3 inches (10.13 m) | 14 feet 3 inches (4.34 m) | 1,093 long tons (1,111 t) | |
| Ben Heilem | | 600 | Steel | Trawler - Steam | 1919 | 122 feet 2 inches (37.24 m) | 22 feet 2 inches (6.76 m) | 14 feet (4.3 m) | 224 long tons (228 t) | |

== Notes ==
- Where available, vessel measurements taken from Lloyd's Register, giving registered length, beam and draft. Hall, Russell and Company's own measurements typically are length overall, beam and moulded depth.
- Yard Number 554, 558 allocated twice in records
