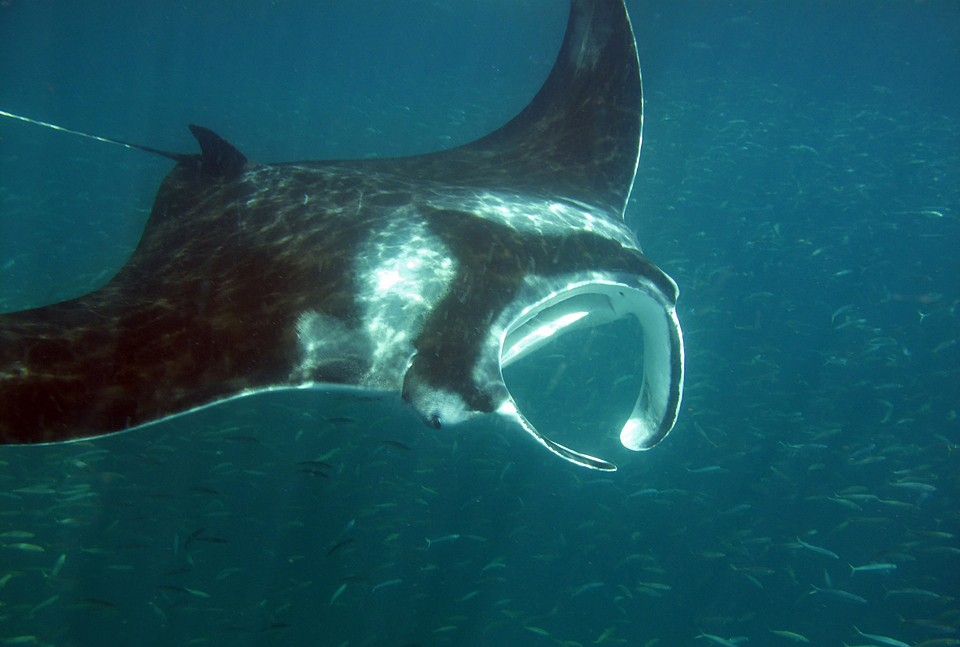
- M. yarae near Isla Holbox, Mexico

Scientific classification
- Kingdom: Animalia
- Phylum: Chordata
- Class: Chondrichthyes
- Subclass: Elasmobranchii
- Order: Myliobatiformes
- Family: Mobulidae
- Genus: Mobula
- Species: M. yarae

Binomial name
- Mobula yarae Bucair & Marshall, 2025

= Atlantic manta ray =

Species of cartilaginous fish

The Atlantic manta ray (Mobula yarae) is a species of ray in the family Mobulidae. It is the third manta ray species to be named, following the giant oceanic manta ray (M. birostris) and reef manta ray (M. alfredi), and one of at least nine extant species in the genus Mobula. With a maximum estimated size (disc width) of 5–6 metres (16–20 ft), the Atlantic manta ray is also among the largest rays, alongside the two other mantas. As suggested by its common name, the Atlantic manta ray occurs throughout the Atlantic Ocean, from the northeastern United States to southeastern Brazil, including Gulf of Mexico and Caribbean islands.

Distinctions between the Atlantic populations of manta rays and M. birostris, which overlaps in range, have been recognized since at least 2009, but a formal specific name was not given until 2025. The specific name, yarae, honors Yara, the "mother of waters", a beautiful figure characterized as a chimaeric mermaid-like part woman, part fish in Guaraní and Tupi mythology.

== Description ==
The physical characteristics of M. yarae are generally similar to those of M. alfredi and M. birostris, with predominantly black and white dorsal and ventral patterns. The shoulder patches of M. yarae exhibit a distinct V-shape, though unlike the pattern found on M. alfredi, the white patches themselves are rounded, rather than two gradient V-shapes. The resulting negative space is reminiscent of a Y-shape in some color variants. Dark spots and other patterns are found near the abdomen, but typically do not extend beyond their gills. Otherwise, their facial coloration is light, unlike the frequent dark spots and blotches of M. birostris. Additionally, M. yarae differs from M. birostris in its stellate (star-shaped) skin denticles with unbalanced ridges, a caudal bulb carrying a residual spine, the number of tooth rows (9 to 13), and general body proportions.

== Phylogeny ==
In their 2025 description of Mobula yarae, Bucair and colleagues used mitochondrial and nuclear DNA from all Mobula species to test the phylogenetic relationships of the genus. Their analyses confidently allied M. yarae with the manta rays, M. alfredi and M. birostris, either as the sister taxon to the latter (nuclear) or to the clade formed by both (mitochondrial). The results of their maximum likelihood tree using mitochondrial DNA are shown in the cladogram below:

- Mobula
  - - Munk's devil ray (Mobula munkiana)
    - - Lesser devil ray (Mobula hypostoma)
      - Lesser Guinean devil ray (Mobula rochebrunei)
  - - - Bentfin devil ray (Mobula thurstoni)
      - - Longhorned pygmy devil ray (Mobula eregoodoo)
        - Shortfin devil ray (Mobula kuhlii)
    - - Chilean devil ray (Mobula tarapacana)
      - - Spinetail mobula (Mobula japanica) + Devil fish (Mobula mobular)
        - - Atlantic manta ray (Mobula yarae)
          - - Reef manta ray (Mobula alfredi)
            - Giant oceanic manta ray (Mobula birostris)

manta rays
