= Devil ray =

Devil ray may refer to:

- Rays of the genus Mobula, cartilaginous fish including:
  - Pygmy devil ray, Mobula eregoodootenkee
  - Lesser devil ray, Mobula hypostoma
  - Spinetail mobula, Mobula japanica
  - Shortfin devil ray, Mobula kuhlii
  - Devil fish, Mobula mobular
  - Munk's devil ray, Mobula munkiana
  - Lesser Guinean devil ray, Mobula rochebrunei
  - Chilean devil ray, Mobula tarapacana
  - Bentfin devil ray, Mobula thurstoni
- Manta ray, Manta birostris, the largest of the rays
- Tampa Bay Rays, an American League Major League Baseball team based in St. Petersburg, Florida, known as the Tampa Bay Devil Rays from 1998–2007

Several of the franchise's affiliated minor league baseball teams use "Devil Rays" or "Rays" as a nickname:
- Southwest Michigan Devil Rays of Battle Creek, Michigan, in the single 'A' Class Midwest League
- Princeton Rays of Princeton, West Virginia, in the 'R' Class Appalachian League

- Devil Ray (DC Comics), a fictional villain from DC Comics based on the character Black Manta and debuting in Justice League Unlimited
