= Memorandum of Understanding on the Conservation of Migratory Sharks =

International agreement on sharks

- Signed: 1 March 2010
- Location: Manila, Philippines
- Effective: 1 March 2010
- Signatories: 48: Australia; Belgium; Benin; Brazil; Chile; Colombia; Comoros; Congo; Costa Rica; Côte d'Ivoire; Denmark; Ecuador; Egypt; European Union; Germany; Ghana; Guinea; Italy; Jordan; Kenya; Liberia; Libya; Madagascar; Mauritania; Monaco; Nauru; Netherlands; New Zealand; Palau; Philippines; Portugal; Romania; Samoa; Saudi Arabia; Senegal; Somalia; South Africa; Sri Lanka; Sudan; Sweden; Syrian Arab Republic; Togo; Tuvalu; United Arab Emirates; United Kingdom; United States of America; Vanuatu; Yemen
- Languages: English, French and Spanish

The Memorandum of Understanding on the Conservation of Migratory Sharks is an international instrument for the conservation of migratory species of sharks. It was founded under the auspices of the Convention on the Conservation of Migratory Species of Wild Animals (CMS; also known as the Bonn Convention).

== Background ==
Many sharks are apex predators and keystone species, meaning that they are at the top of their food chain and play a crucial role in maintaining the health of marine environments. Sharks whose members cyclically and predictably move large distances are considered migratory and many pelagic (open ocean) shark species fall into this category. The IUCN considers one-third of all shark species as threatened or near threatened. For migratory sharks the situation is worse, with almost 50% being considered as threatened and 27% being considered as near threatened. Relatively little is known about the behavior of migratory sharks; researchers have been surprised by data on their migrations. Knowledge of 47% of sharks is too limited to determine a conservation status.

Before the Migratory Shark MOU was developed, there were no international standards for the management of migratory sharks. Sharks that migrate can travel great distances in the world's oceans, with the whale shark being recorded on journeys of up to 22,000 kilometres (14,000 mi) long. These extensive migrations frequently and inevitably involve the crossing of national boundaries and through international waters; as the national regulations of coastal nations only apply to 200 nautical miles (370 km) of their coastlines, large parts of these journeys are consequently unregulated.

The Migratory Shark MOU was the first global instrument published by the CMS, and the first one ever regarding sharks.

== Objectives ==
The MOU is aimed at facilitating international coordination for the protection, conservation and management of the sharks involved, through multilateral, intergovernmental discussion and scientific research. It is a global non-binding treaty aimed at improving "compliance and enforcement efforts" for states whose waters are inhabited by these sharks and to states whose flagships pass through international waters inhabited by these sharks. Signatories to this treaty intend to expand information sharing.

The memorandum states:

The objective of this Memorandum of Understanding is to achieve and maintain a favourable conservation status for migratory sharks based on the best available scientific information, taking into account the socio-economic and other values of these species for the people of the Signatory States.

== Species ==
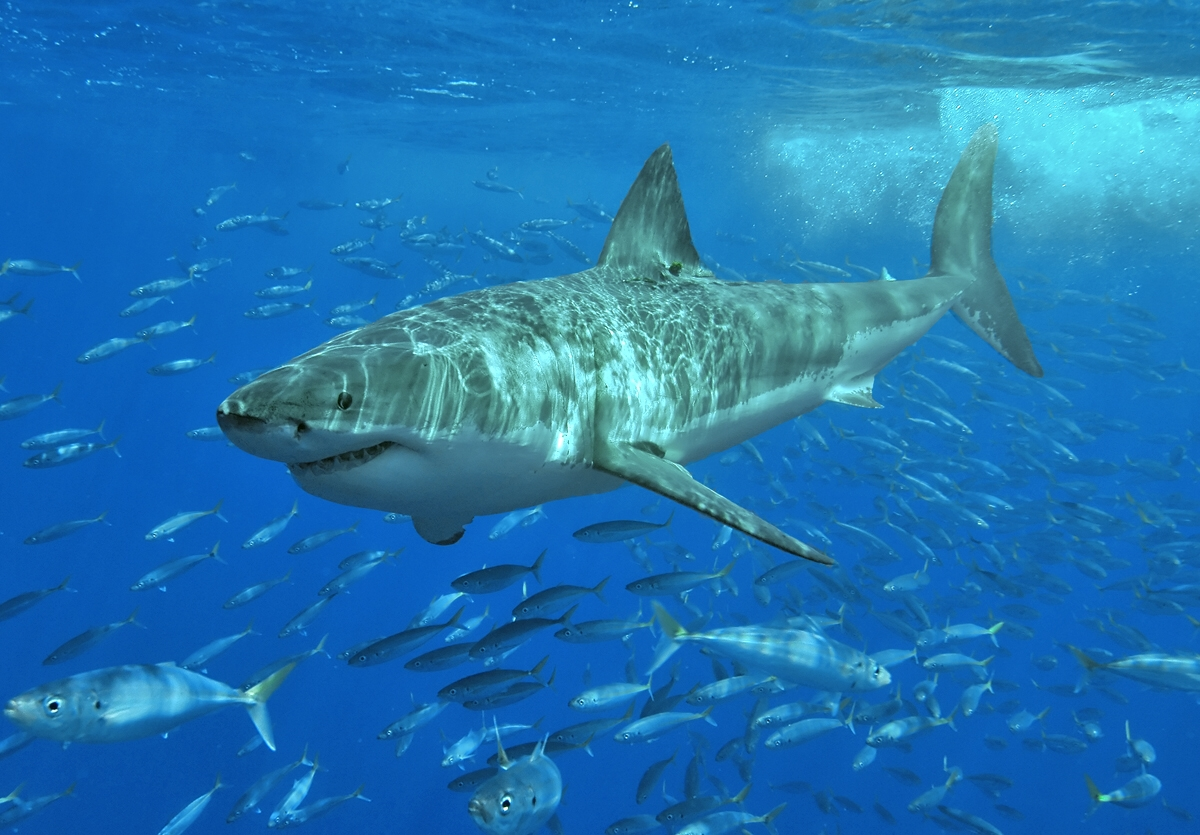
The great white shark is one of the 29 species covered by this MOU.

For the purpose of the MOU, sharks include all species in the class Chondrichthyes, which cover sharks, rays, skates and chimaeras. Currently there are 29 species listed in Annex I of the MOU, although the annex may be edited following consensus obtained at a meeting of the memorandum's signatories.

Currently listed:

1. Pelagic Thresher Shark (Alopias pelagicus)
2. Bigeye Tresher Shark (Alopias superciliosus)
3. Common Thresher Shark(Alopias vulpinus)
4. Narrow Sawfish (Anoxypristis cuspidata)
5. Silky Shark (Carcharhinus falciformis)
6. Great White Shark (Carcharodon carcharias)
7. Basking Shark (Cetorhinus maximus)
8. Shortfin Mako Shark (Isurus oxyrinchus)
9. Longfin Mako Shark (Isurus paucus)
10. Porbeagle (Lamna nasus)
11. Reef Manta Ray (Manta alfredi)
12. Manta Ray (Manta birostris)
13. Pygmy Manta Ray (Mobula eregoodootenkee)
14. Lesser Devil Ray (Mobula hypostoma)
15. Spinetail Mobula (Mobula japanica)
16. Shortfin Devil Ray (Mobula kuhlii)
17. Giant Devil Ray (Mobula mobular)
18. Munk's Devil Ray (Mobula munkiana)
19. Lesser Guinean Devil Ray (Mobula rochebrunei)
20. Chilean Devil Ray (Mobula tarapacana)
21. Bentfin Devil Ray (Mobula thurstoni)
22. Dwarf Sawfish (Pristis clavata)
23. Smalltooth Sawfish (Pristis pectinata)
24. Largetooth Sawfish (Pristis pristis)
25. Green Sawfish (Pristis zijsron)
26. Whale shark (Rhincodon typus)
27. Scalloped hammerhead shark (Sphyrna lewini)
28. Great hammerhead shark (Sphyrna mokarran)
29. Northern hemisphere populations of the Spiny Dogfish (Squalus acanthias)

== Signatories ==
Original signatories Subsequent signatorieses

The MOU is a legally non-binding agreement that currently has 48 Signatories, including the European Union. The MOU goes into immediate effect for signatories.

This Memorandum of Understanding is open for signature by the Range States and regional economic integration organizations of the shark species listed in Annex 1 of this Memorandum of Understanding. Range States are defined as any State that exercises jurisdiction over any part of the range of migratory sharks, or a State, flag vessels of which are engaged outside its national jurisdictional limits in taking, or which have the potential to take, migratory sharks. As the CMS Sharks MOU was concluded as a legally non-binding agreement, a formal ratification process on the national level is not necessary.

About 40 national governments agreed to the original adoption of the MoU. Eleven of these signed it on 12 February 2010, although only 10 were needed. The original signatories were Congo, Costa Rica, Ghana, Guinea, Kenya, Liberia, Palau, the Philippines, Senegal, Togo, and the United States. Nauru and Tuvalu signed on 9 September 2010. Australia signed on 4 February 2011. Sharks were already protected in Australian waters, but the government intends to work closely to distribute more information to other signatories. Chile signed on 6 May 2011. South Africa signed on 12 May 2011. In November 2011, the European Union signed on to the MOU along with the European nations of Belgium, Denmark, Germany, Italy, Monaco, Netherlands, and Romania. The United Kingdom signed in June 2012. Bermuda, the Falkland Islands, South Georgia and the South Sandwich Islands, the British Indian Ocean Territory, and the Isle of Man, all dependencies of the United Kingdom, also signed the agreement. Vanuatu signed in February 2013. On 16 October 2013, Colombia became the 27th country to the sign the Memorandum of Understanding on the Conservation of Migratory Sharks. Sweden and Samoa signed the UNEP/CMS Sharks MOU respectively on 5 November 2014 in Quito and 7 November in Apia.

== Meetings ==
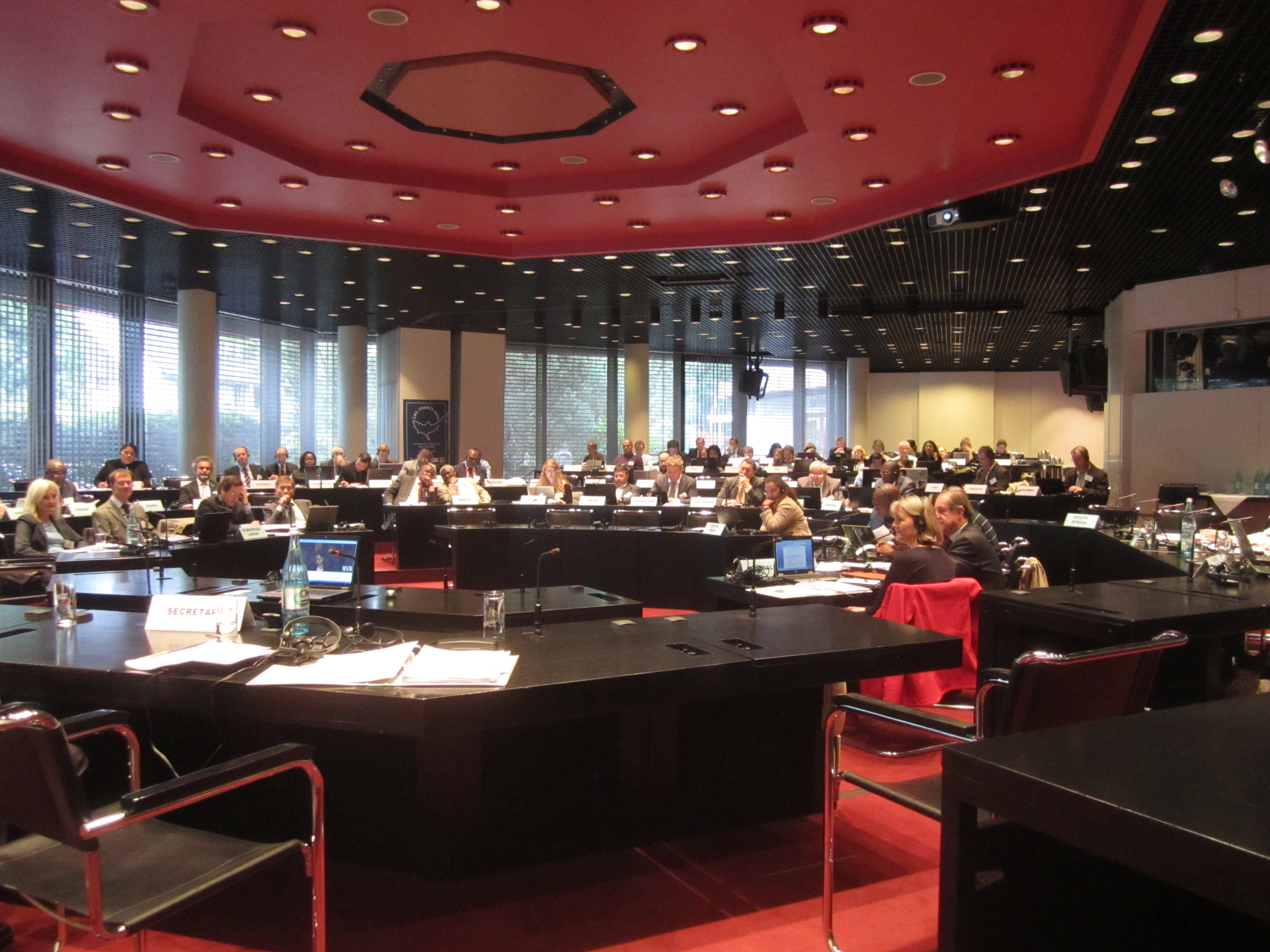
First Meeting of Signatories to the Sharks MoU, Bonn, Germany, 24–27 September 2012

After two initial meetings in 2007 and 2008, the Memorandum of Understanding (MOU) was signed into effect on 1 March 2010, in the city of Manila, meeting the required amount of 10 signatures, and taking effect immediately for each signatory. It has been adopted by over 48 States in total. The original text is written in English, French, and Spanish, and its creation was chaired by the Philippines.

The First Meeting of Signatories to the Sharks MOU was held in Bonn, Germany, 24–27 September 2012. At the meeting, Signatory States adopted a new conservation plan, which aims to catalyze regional initiatives to reduce threats to migratory sharks. Signatory States also agreed to involve fishing industry representatives, NGOs, and scientists in implementing the conservation plan.

The Second Meeting of Signatories to the Sharks MOU was held in San José, Costa Rica, 15–19 February 2016. Signatory States agreed to add 22 further shark and ray species to its Annex I, defined the Advisory Committee's tasks as requested by the revised EU amendment to the MOU, and created the Conservation Working Group, which comprises a list of experts concerned with shark conservation. Furthermore, the Secretariat highlighted the importance of a cooperation strategy with Regional Seas Conventions (RSCs), Regional Fishing Management Organizations (RFMOs) and other fisheries-related organizations in order to efficiently conserve sharks, fins and rays. Moreover, Portugal was welcomed as fortieth member of the Sharks MOU.

From 10 to 14 December 2018, the Third Meeting of Signatories to the Sharks MOU was held in Monaco.

Meetings of Signatories are organized regularly to review the conservation status of the species and the implementation of the MOU and Action Plan. At the meetings there is also a possibility for further States and cooperating organizations to sign the MOU.

== Conservation Plan ==
A Conservation Plan has been adopted by the Signatories in 2012 whose implementation forms the basis of the ongoing work under the MOU. A favourable conservation status is achieved when the abundance and structure of populations of migratory sharks remains at levels adequate to maintain ecosystem integrity. The Conservation Plan, listed in Annex 3 of the MOU, is based on five objectives to achieve this goal:

- Improving the understanding of migratory shark populations through research, monitoring and information exchange
- Ensuring that directed and non-directed fisheries for sharks are sustainable
- Ensuring to the extent practicable the protection of critical habitats and migratory corridors and critical life stages of sharks
- Increasing public awareness of threats to sharks and their habitats, and enhance public participation in conservation activities
- Enhancing national, regional and international cooperation

It requires the cooperation among governments, fishing industries, NGOs, local communities and scientists. An Advisory Committee has been established to provide expert advice and suggestions on new initiatives for the implementation of the plan.

== See also ==
- Shark finning
