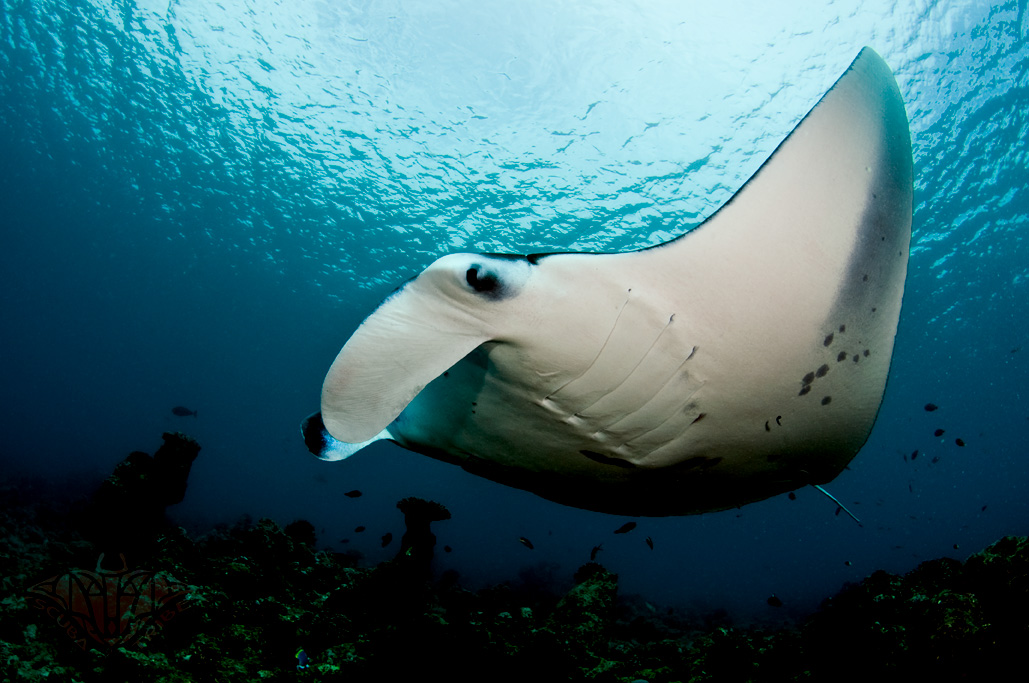
- Mobula alfredi at Dharavandhoo, Maldives

Scientific classification
- Kingdom: Animalia
- Phylum: Chordata
- Class: Chondrichthyes
- Subclass: Elasmobranchii
- Order: Myliobatiformes
- Family: Mobulidae
- Genus: Mobula

Species
- Mobula alfredi Mobula birostris Mobula yarae †Mobula hynei
- Range of manta rays

= Manta ray =

Manta ray Temporal range: 28.1–0 Ma Early Miocene to present

Subgenus of fishes

Manta rays are large rays belonging to the genus Mobula (formerly its own genus Manta). Three species are known: M. birostris, the largest at 7 m (23 ft) in width, M. yarae, which reaches 6 m (20 ft), and M. alfredi, the smallest at 5.5 m (18 ft). All three have triangular pectoral fins, horn-shaped cephalic fins and large, forward-facing mouths. They are classified among the Myliobatiformes (stingrays and relatives) and are placed in the family Myliobatidae (eagle rays). They have one of the highest brain-to-body ratio of all fish, advanced cognition, and may understand mirror contingencies.

Mantas are found in warm temperate, subtropical and tropical waters. All three species are pelagic; M. birostris and M. yarae migrate across open oceans, singly or in groups, while M. alfredi tends to be resident and coastal. They are filter feeders and eat large quantities of zooplankton, which they gather with their open mouths as they swim. However, research suggests that the majority of their diet comes from mesopelagic sources. Gestation lasts over a year and mantas give birth to live pups. Mantas may visit cleaning stations for the removal of parasites. Like whales, they breach for unknown reasons.

M. birostris and M. alfredi are both listed as vulnerable by the International Union for Conservation of Nature. Anthropogenic threats include pollution, entanglement in fishing nets, and direct harvesting of their gill rakers for use in Chinese medicine. Manta rays are particularly valued for their gill plates, which are traded internationally. Their slow reproductive rate exacerbates these threats. They are protected in international waters by the Convention on Migratory Species of Wild Animals, but are more vulnerable closer to shore. Areas where mantas congregate are popular with tourists. Only a few public aquariums are large enough to house them.

== Etymology ==
The name manta is Portuguese and Spanish for mantle (cloak or blanket), a type of blanket-shaped trap traditionally used to catch rays. Mantas are known as "devilfish" because of their horn-shaped cephalic fins, which are imagined to give them an "evil" appearance.

== Taxonomy ==
Manta rays are members of the order Myliobatiformes which consists of stingrays and their relatives. The genus Manta is part of the eagle ray family Myliobatidae, where it is grouped in the subfamily Mobulinae along with the smaller Mobula devil rays. In 2018, an analysis of DNA, and to a lesser degree, morphology, found that Mobula was paraphyletic with respect to the manta rays; that is, some members of genus Mobula are closer related to the members of the genus Manta than they are to fellow Mobula, and the researchers recommended treating Manta as a junior synonym of Mobula.

Mantas evolved from bottom-dwelling stingrays, eventually developing more wing-like pectoral fins. M. birostris still has a vestigial remnant of a sting barb in the form of a caudal spine. The mouths of most rays lie on the underside of the head, while in mantas, they are right at the front. The edges of the jaws line up while in devil rays, the lower jaw shifts back when the mouth closes. Manta rays and devil rays are the only ray species that have evolved into filter feeders. Manta rays have dorsal slit-like spiracles, traits which they share with the devil fish and Chilean devil ray.

=== Species ===
The scientific naming of mantas has had a convoluted history, during which several names were used for both the genus (Ceratoptera, Brachioptilon, Daemomanta, and Diabolicthys) and species (such as vampyrus, americana, johnii, and hamiltoni). All were eventually treated as synonyms of the single species Manta birostris. The genus name Manta was first published in 1829 by Dr Edward Nathaniel Bancroft of Jamaica. The specific name birostris is ascribed to Johann Julius Walbaum (1792) by some authorities and to Johann August Donndorff (1798) by others. The specific name alfredi was first used by Australian zoologist Gerard Krefft, who named the manta after Prince Alfred.

A 2009 study analyzed the differences in morphology, including color, meristic variation, spine, dermal denticles (tooth-like scales), and teeth of different populations. Two distinct species emerged: the smaller M. alfredi found in the Indo-Pacific and tropical East Atlantic, and the larger M. birostris found throughout tropical, subtropical and warm temperate oceans. The former is more coastal, while the latter is more ocean-going and migratory. A 2010 study on mantas around Japan confirmed the morphological and genetic differences between M. birostris and M. alfredi.

A third possible species, preliminarily called Manta sp. cf. birostris, reaches at least 6 m (20 ft) in width, and inhabits the tropical West Atlantic, including the Caribbean. In 2025, it was formally described as the Atlantic manta ray (Mobula yarae). In their 2025 description of Mobula yarae, Bucair and colleagues used mitochondrial and nuclear DNA from all Mobula species to test the phylogenetic relationships of the genus. Their analyses confidently allied M. yarae with the manta rays, M. alfredi and M. birostris, either as the sister taxon to the latter (nuclear) or to the clade formed by both (mitochondrial). The results of their maximum likelihood tree using mitochondrial DNA are shown in the cladogram below:

- Mobula
  - - Munk's devil ray (Mobula munkiana)
    - - Lesser devil ray (Mobula hypostoma)
      - Lesser Guinean devil ray (Mobula rochebrunei)
  - - - Bentfin devil ray (Mobula thurstoni)
      - - Longhorned pygmy devil ray (Mobula eregoodoo)
        - Shortfin devil ray (Mobula kuhlii)
    - - Chilean devil ray (Mobula tarapacana)
      - - Spinetail mobula (Mobula japanica) + Devil fish (Mobula mobular)
        - - Atlantic manta ray (Mobula yarae)
          - - Reef manta ray (Mobula alfredi)
            - Giant oceanic manta ray (Mobula birostris)

manta rays

=== Fossil record ===
While some small teeth have been found, few fossilized skeletons of manta rays have been discovered. Their cartilaginous skeletons do not preserve well, as they lack the calcification of the bony fish. Only three sedimentary beds bearing manta ray fossils are known, one from the Oligocene in South Carolina and two from the Miocene and Pliocene in North Carolina. M. hynei is a fossil species dating to Early Pliocene North America. Remains of an extinct species have been found in the Chandler Bridge Formation of South Carolina. These were originally described as Manta fragilis, but were later reclassified as Paramobula fragilis.

== Characteristics ==
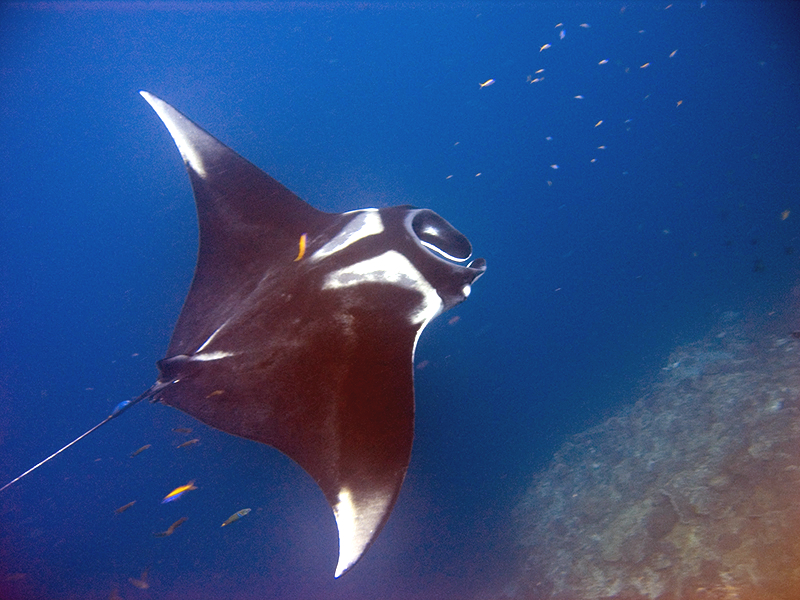
Dorsal view of M. birostris showing shoulder markings

Manta rays have broad heads, triangular pectoral fins, and horn-shaped cephalic fins located on both sides of their mouths. They have horizontally flattened bodies with eyes on the sides of their heads behind the cephalic fins, and gill slits on their ventral surfaces. Their tails lack skeletal support and are shorter than their disc-like bodies. The dorsal fins are small and at the base of the tail. Mantas can reach 1,350 kg (2,980 lb). In both species, the width is about 2.2 times the length of the body; M. birostris reaches at least 7 m (23 ft) in width, while M. alfredi reaches about 5.5 m (18 ft). Their skin is covered in mucus. Mantas normally have a "chevron" coloration. They are typically black or dark on top with pale markings on their "shoulders". Underneath, they are usually white or pale with distinctive dark markings by which individual mantas can be recognized, as well as some shading. Individuals can also vary from mostly black (melanism) to mostly white (leucism). These color morphs appear to be products of neutral mutations and have no effects on fitness. A pink manta ray has been observed in Australia's Great Barrier Reef and scientists believe this could be due to a genetic mutation causing erythrism. The fish, spotted near Lady Elliot Island, is the world's only known pink manta ray.

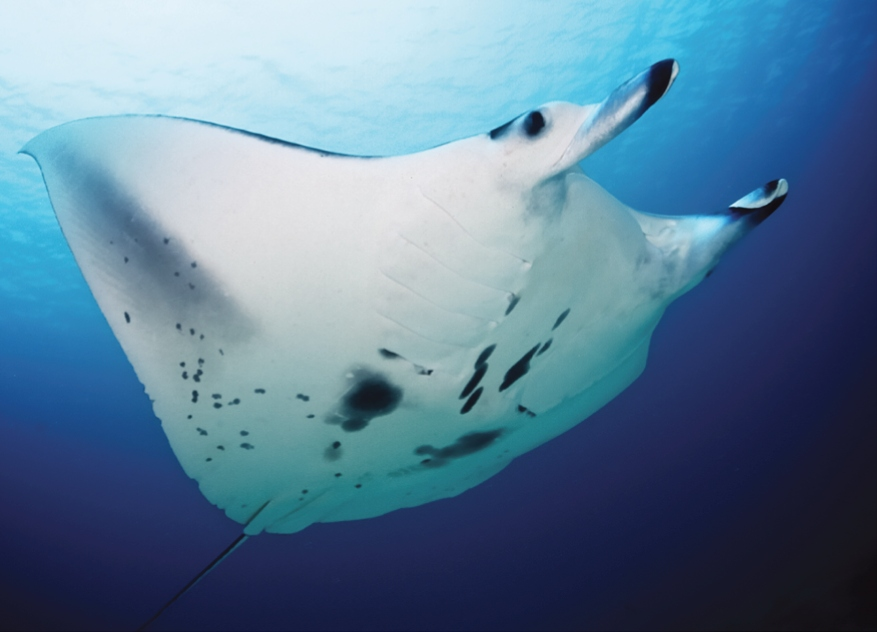
M. alfredi with mouth closed, cephalic fins rolled and ventral surface showing distinctive markings

The two species of manta differ in color patterns, dermal denticles, and dentition. M. birostris has more angular shoulder markings, ventral dark spots on the abdominal region, charcoal-coloured ventral outlines on the pectoral fins, and a dark colored mouth. The shoulder markings of M. alfredi are more rounded, while its ventral spots are located near the posterior end and between the gill slits, and the mouth is white or pale colored. The denticles have multiple cusps and overlap in M. birostris, while those of M. alfredi are evenly spaced and lack cusps. Both species have small, square-shaped teeth on the lower jaw, but M. birostris also has enlarged teeth on the upper jaw. Unlike M. alfredi, M. birostris has a caudal spine near its dorsal fin.

Mantas move through the water by the wing-like movements of their pectoral fins. Their large mouths are rectangular, and face forward. The spiracles typical of rays are vestigial and concealed by small flaps of skin, and mantas must keep swimming with their mouths open to keep oxygenated water passing over their gills. The cephalic fins are usually spiraled but flatten during foraging. The fish's gill arches have pallets of pinkish-brown gill rakers, which are made of spongy tissue that collects food particles. Mantas track down prey using visual and olfactory senses. They have one of the highest brain-to-body mass ratios and the largest brain size of all fish. Their brains have retia mirabilia which may serve to keep them warm. M. alfredi has been shown to dive to depths over 400 metres (1,300 ft), while the Chilean devil ray, which has a similar structure, dives to nearly 2,000 metres (6,600 ft).

== Behavior and ecology ==
Swimming behavior in mantas differs across habitats: when travelling over deep water, they swim at a constant rate in a straight line, while further inshore, they usually bask or swim idly around. Mantas may travel alone or in groups up to 50. They may associate with other fish species, as well as sea birds and marine mammals. Mantas sometimes breach or leap out of the water. Individuals in a group may make aerial jumps in succession. Mantas may leap forward and re-enter head first, tail first or make somersaults. The reason for breaching is not known; possible explanations include communication, or the removal of parasites and remoras (suckerfish).

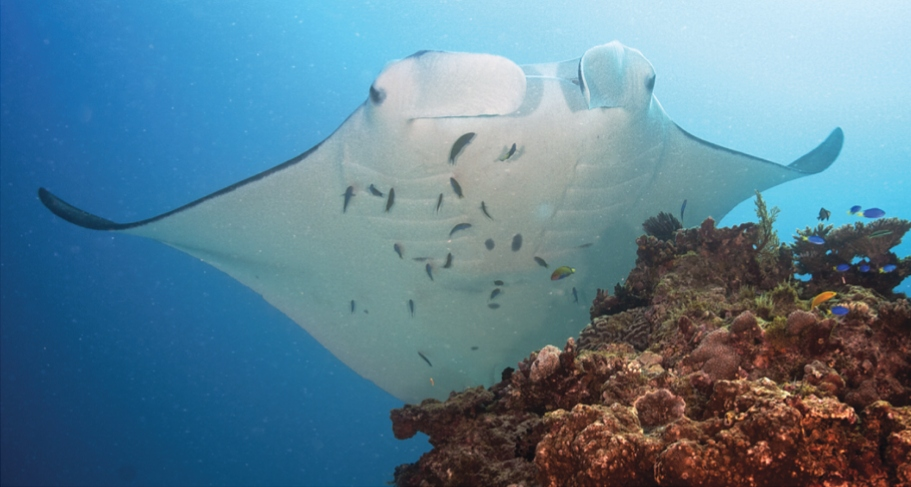
M. alfredi at a coral reef cleaning station with fish picking off parasites

Mantas visit cleaning stations on coral reefs for the removal of external parasites. The ray adopts a near-stationary position close to the coral surface for several minutes while the cleaner fish feed. Such visits most frequently occur when the tide is high. Individual mantas may exhibit philopatry by revisiting the same cleaning station or feeding area repeatedly and appear to have cognitive maps of their environment. In addition, it has been confirmed that reef manta rays form a bond with a specific individual and act together.

Mantas may be preyed upon by large sharks, orcas and false killer whales. They may also harbor parasitic copepods. Mantas can remove internal parasites by sticking their intestines up to 30 cm (12 in) out of their cloaca and squeezing them out, often while defecating. Remoras adhere themselves onto mantas for transportation and use their mouths as shelter. Though they may clean them of parasites, remoras can also damage the manta's gills and skin, and increase its swimming load.

In 2016, scientists published a study in which manta rays were shown to exhibit behavior associated with self-awareness. In a modified mirror test, the individuals engaged in contingency checking and unusual self-directed behavior.

During September 2026 people recorded 29-foot long Manta Rays off of the coast of San Diego. This is the largest one recorded of its species in San Diego. These animals are not native to the San Diego coastline, the reason they have been found recently is because of the conditions that El Niño causes. It causes warmer oceans making Manta Rays along with other animals to migrate north towards the California Coastline.

=== Feeding ===
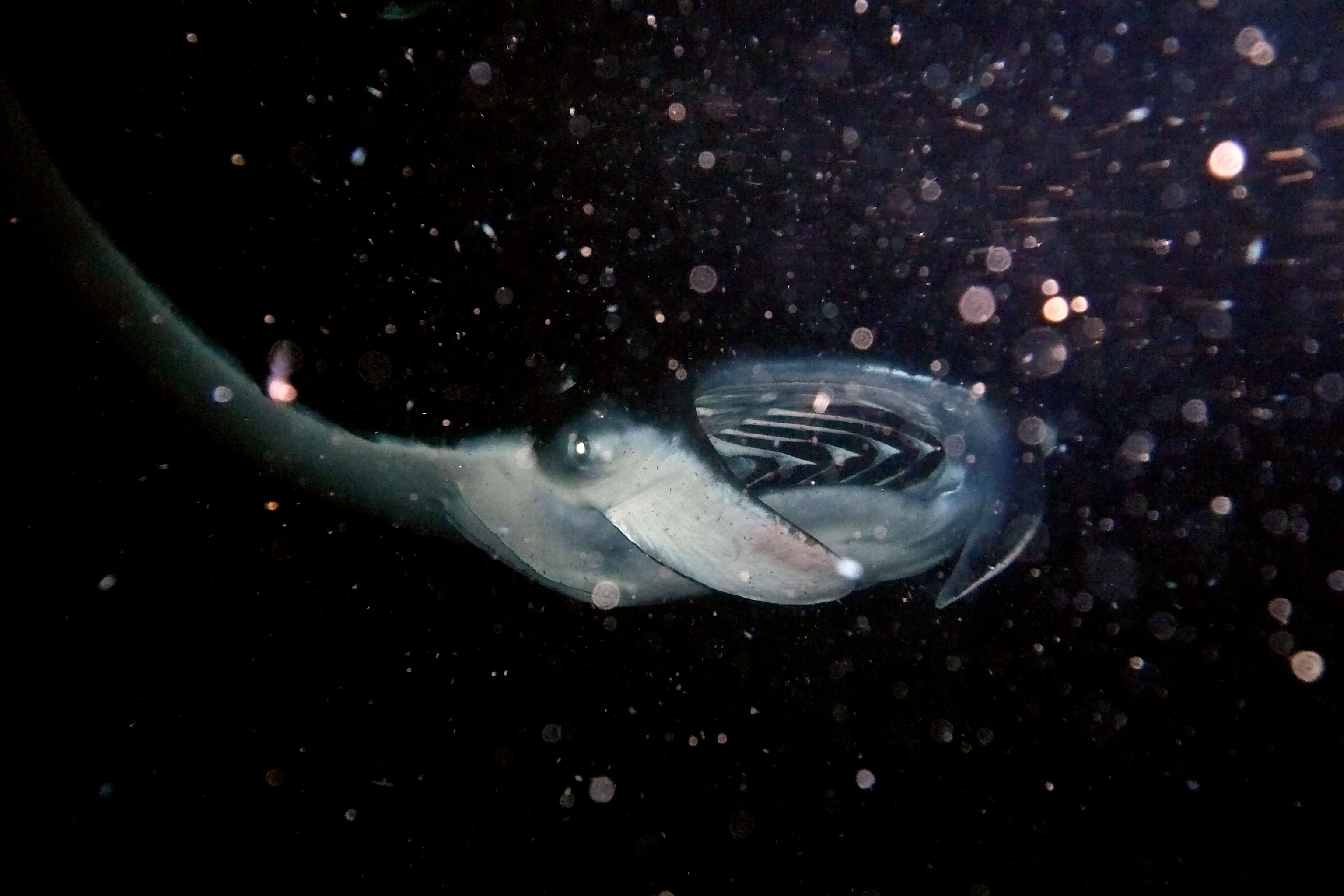
M. birostris feeding on plankton

Manta rays are filter feeders as well as macropredators. On the surface, they consume large quantities of zooplankton in the form of shrimp, krill, and planktonic crabs. In deeper depths, mantas consume small to medium-sized fish. Foraging mantas flatten their cephalic fins to channel food into their mouths. During filter feeding, small particles are collected by the tissue between the gill arches. The standard method of feeding for a lone manta is simply swimming horizontally, turning 180 degrees to feed in the other direction. Up and down movements, sideways tilting and 360 degree somersaults are also observed.

Mantas engage in a number of group feeding behaviors. An individual may "piggy-back" on a larger, horizontally feeding individual, placing itself over its back. "Chain-feeding" involves them aligning back-to-front and swimming horizontally. Chain-feeding mantas may create a circle, with the lead individual meeting up with the stragglers. More individuals may join, creating a "cyclone" of mantas spiraling upwards. With a diameter of 15 m (49 ft), these cyclones consist of up to 150 mantas and last up to an hour. Studies have shown that around 27% of the diet of M. birostris is from the surface, while around 73% is at deeper depths. Mantas may forage on the ocean floor with the cephalic fins splayed apart.

During filter feeding, the gills may get clogged up, forcing mantas to cough and create a cloud of gill waste. The rays commonly do this above cleaning stations, providing a feast for the cleaner fish. Mantas defecate dark red fecal matter which is often mistaken for blood.

=== Lifecycle ===
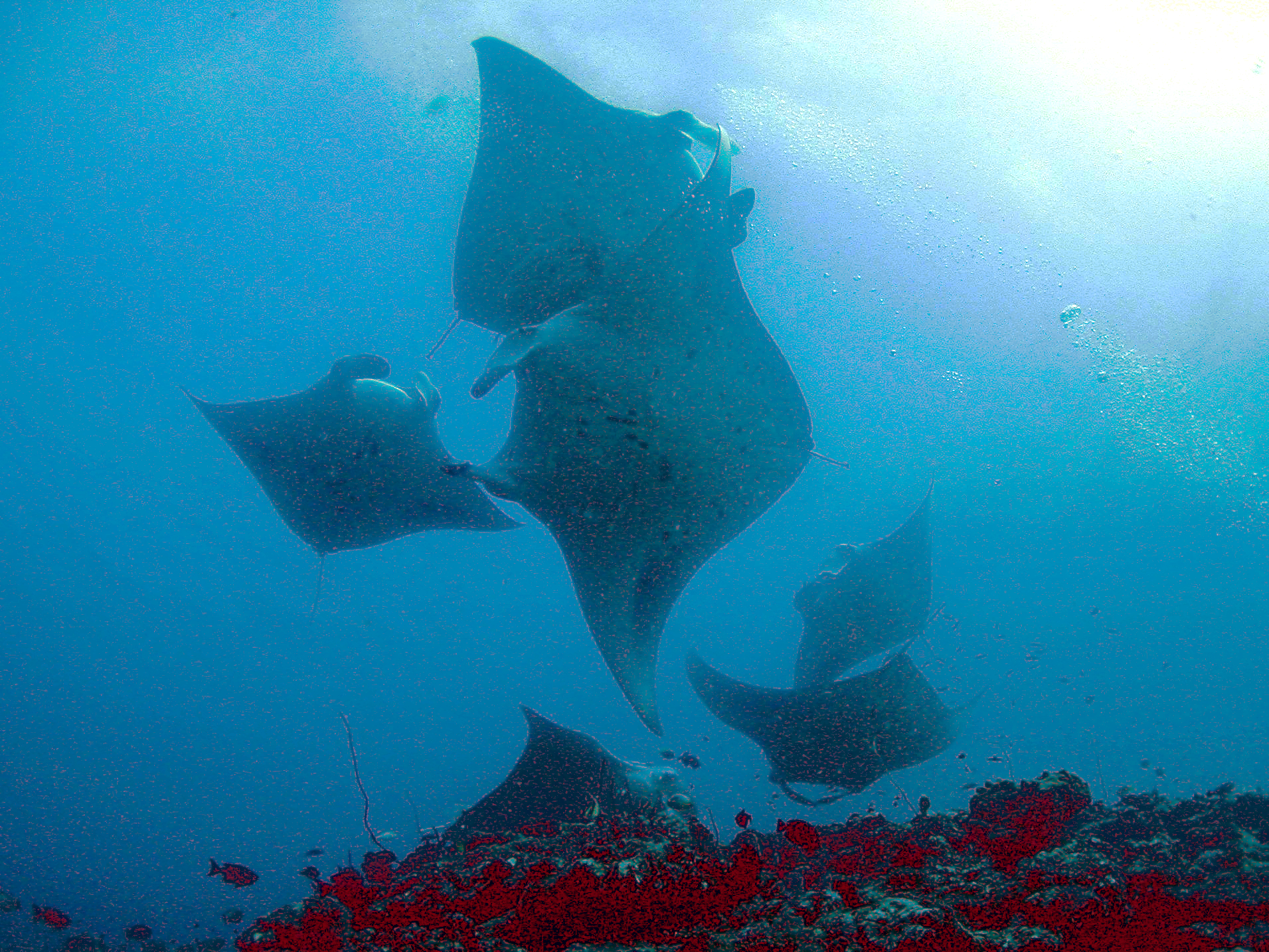
M. alfredi group in the Maldives

Mating takes place at different times of the year in different parts of the manta's range. Courtship is difficult to observe in this fast-swimming fish, although mating "trains" with multiple individuals swimming closely behind each other are sometimes seen in shallow water. These mating trains often consist of multiple male rays simultaneously pursuing an individual female. The mating sequence may be triggered by a full moon and seems to be initiated by a male following closely behind a female while she travels at around 10 km/h (6.2 mph). He makes repeated efforts to grasp her pectoral fin with his mouth, which may take 20 to 30 minutes. Once he has a tight grip, he turns upside-down and presses his ventral side against hers. He then inserts one of his claspers into her cloaca, where it remains for 60–90 seconds. The claspers form a tube and a siphon propels semen from the genital papilla into the oviduct. The male continues to grip the female's pectoral fin with his teeth for a further few minutes as both continue to swim, often followed by up to 20 other males. The pair then parts, the female being left with scars on her fin.

The fertilized eggs develop within the female's oviduct. At first, they are enclosed in an egg case while the developing embryos absorb the yolk. After hatching, the pups remain in the oviduct and receive additional nutrition from milky secretions called histotroph. With no umbilical cord or placenta, the unborn pup relies on buccal pumping to obtain oxygen. Brood size is usually one or occasionally two. The gestation period is thought to be 12–13 months. When fully developed, the pup resembles a miniature adult and is expelled from the oviduct with no further parental care. In wild populations, an interval of two years between births may be normal, but a few individuals become pregnant in consecutive years, demonstrating an annual ovulatory cycle. The Okinawa Churaumi Aquarium has had some success in breeding M. alfredi, with one female giving birth in three successive years. In one of these pregnancies, the gestation period was 372 days and at birth the pup had a width of 192 cm (76 in) and weight of 70 kg (150 lb). In Indonesia, M. birostris males appear to mature at 3.75 m (12 ft), while female mature around 4 m (13 ft). In the Maldives, males of M. alfredi mature at a width of 2.5 m (8 ft 2 in), while females mature at 3 m (9.8 ft). In Hawaii, M. alfredi matures at a width of 2.8 m (9 ft 2 in) for males and 3.4 m (11 ft) for females. Female mantas appear to mature at 8–10 years. Manta rays may live as long as 50 years.

== Distribution and habitat ==
Mantas are found in tropical and subtropical waters in all the world's major oceans, and also venture into temperate seas. The furthest from the equator they have been recorded is North Carolina in the United States (31°N) and the North Island of New Zealand (36°S). They prefer water temperatures above 68 °F (20 °C) and M. alfredi is predominantly found in tropical areas. Both species are pelagic. M. birostris lives mostly in the open ocean, travelling with the currents and migrating to areas where upwellings of nutrient-rich water increase prey concentrations.

Fish that have been fitted with radio transmitters have traveled as far as 1,000 km (620 mi) from where they were caught. A satellite-tag project demonstrated they descended to depths of at least 1,250 m (4,100 ft). M. alfredi is a more resident and coastal species. Seasonal migrations do occur, but they are shorter than those of M. birostris. Mantas are common around coasts from spring to fall, but travel further offshore during the winter. They keep close to the surface and in shallow water in daytime, while at night they swim at greater depths.

== Conservation issues ==
=== Threats ===
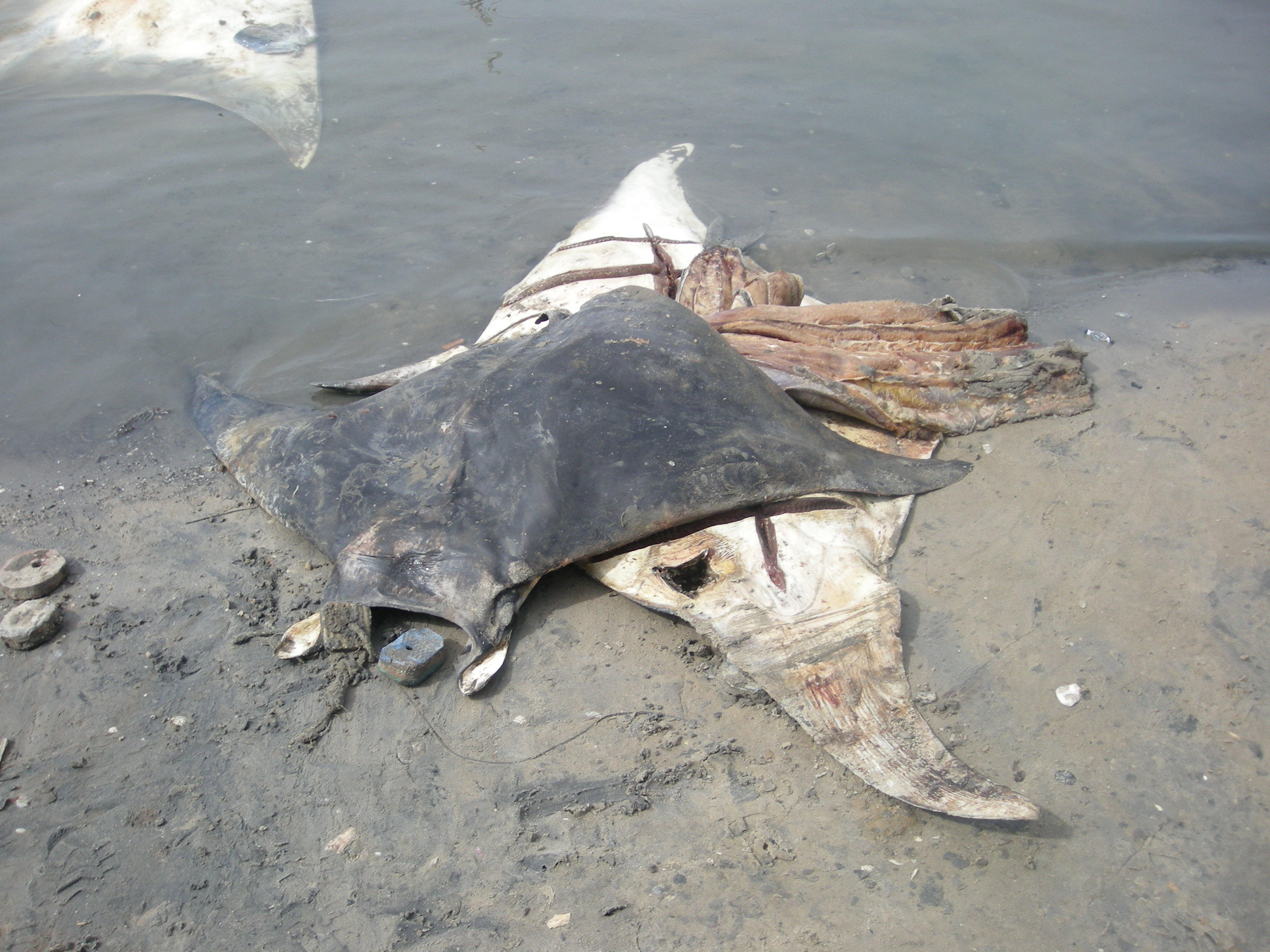
Dead mantas ashore in Senegal

The greatest threat to manta rays is overfishing. M. birostris is not evenly distributed over the oceans, but is concentrated in areas that provide the food resources it requires, while M. alfredi is even more localized. Their distributions are thus fragmented, with little evidence of intermingling of subpopulations. Because of their long lifespans and low reproductive rate, overfishing can severely reduce local populations with little likelihood that individuals from elsewhere will replace them.

Both commercial and artisanal fisheries have targeted mantas for their meat and products. They are typically caught with nets, trawls, and harpoons. Mantas were once captured by fisheries in California and Australia for their liver oil and skin, the latter made into abrasives. Their flesh is edible and is consumed in some countries, but is unattractive compared to other fish. Demand for their gill rakers, the cartilaginous structures protecting the gills, has recently entered Chinese medicine. To fill the growing demand in Asia for gill rakers, targeted fisheries have developed in the Philippines, Indonesia, Mozambique, Madagascar, India, Pakistan, Sri Lanka, Brazil, and Tanzania. Each year, thousands of manta rays, primarily M. birostris, are caught and killed purely for their gill rakers. A fisheries study in Sri Lanka and India estimated that over 1000 were being sold in the country's fish markets each year. By comparison, M. birostris populations at most of the key aggregation sites around the world are estimated to have significantly fewer than 1000 individuals. Targeted fisheries for manta rays in the Gulf of California, the west coast of Mexico, India, Sri Lanka, Indonesia, and the Philippines have reduced populations in these areas dramatically.

Manta rays are subject to other human impacts. Because mantas must swim constantly to flush oxygen-rich water over their gills, they are vulnerable to entanglement and subsequent suffocation. Mantas cannot swim backwards, and because of their protruding cephalic fins, are prone to entanglement in fishing lines, nets, ghost nets, and even loose mooring lines. When snared, mantas often attempt to free themselves by somersaulting, tangling themselves further. Loose, trailing line can wrap around and cut its way into their flesh, resulting in irreversible injury. Similarly, mantas become bycatch when entangled in gill nets designed for smaller fish. Some mantas are injured by collision with boats, especially in areas where they congregate and are easily observed. Other threats or factors that may affect manta numbers are climate change, tourism, pollution from oil spills, and the ingestion of microplastics.

=== Status ===
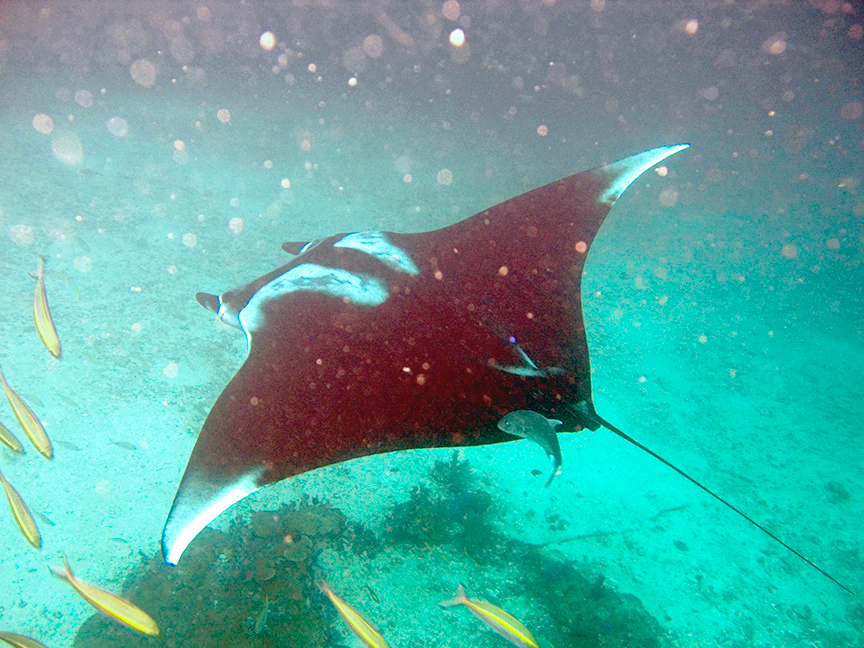
M. birostris at Hin Daeng, near Phi Phi Islands, Thailand

The IUCN listed the reef manta as vulnerable in 2019 and the giant manta as endangered in 2020. In 2011, mantas became strictly protected in international waters because of their inclusion in the Convention on Migratory Species of Wild Animals. The CMS is an international treaty organization concerned with conserving migratory species and habitats on a global scale. Although individual nations were already protecting manta rays, the fish often migrate through unregulated waters, putting them at increased risk from overfishing. The Manta Trust is a UK-based charity dedicated to research and conservation efforts for manta rays. The organization's website is also an information resource for manta conservation and biology.

In 2009, Hawaii became the first state in the United States to introduce a ban on the killing or capturing of manta rays. Previously, no fishery for mantas existed in the state but migratory fish that pass the islands are now protected. In 2010, Ecuador introduced a law prohibiting all fishing for manta and other rays, their retention as bycatch and their sale.

== Relation with humans ==
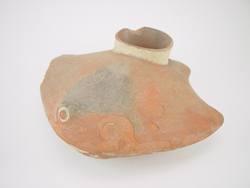
Ceramic manta ray made by Moche people, 200 AD, Larco Museum Lima, Peru

The ancient Peruvian Moche people worshipped the sea and its animals. Their art often depicts manta rays. Historically, mantas were feared for their size and power. Sailors believed that they were dangerous to humans and could pull ships out to sea by the anchor. This attitude changed around 1976, when divers around the Gulf of California found them to be placid and safe to interact with. Several divers photographed themselves with mantas, including Jaws author Peter Benchley.

=== Aquariums ===
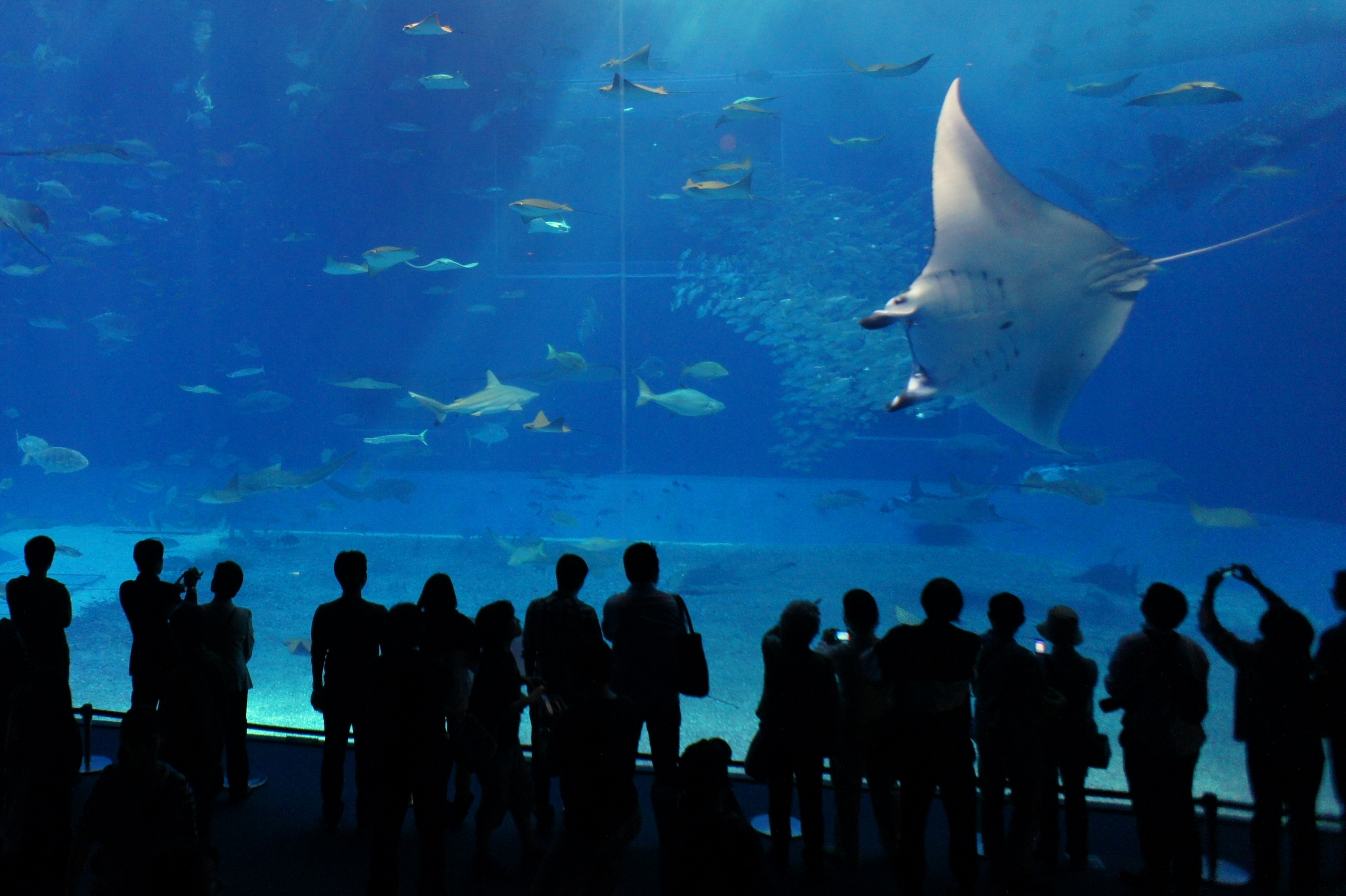
Manta alfredi at Okinawa Churaumi Aquarium

The Okinawa Ocean Expo Aquarium acquired mantas in 1978 which survived for four days. In addition, at the Okinawa Churaumi Aquarium, a male manta ray, which started captivity in 1992 at its predecessor, the Okinawa Ocean Expo Aquarium, was recorded to have lived for approximately 23 years. The Okinawa Churaumi Aquarium houses manta rays in the "Kuroshio Sea" tank, one of the largest aquarium tanks in the world. Since 2018 they also keep giant oceanic manta ray. The first manta ray birth in captivity took place there in 2007. Although this pup did not survive, the aquarium has since had the birth of four more manta rays in 2008, 2009, 2010 and 2011. However, although Manta became pregnant in 2012, she was stillborn. In 2013, she became pregnant, but her mother, manta ray, died and the pup that was taken out died. In August 2024, a female all black body manta ray kept in the Kuroshio tank gave birth. The pups were born black all over like their mother, 1.6 metres (5 ft) wide, and weighed 42 kilograms (93 lb).

There are currently three mantas spending time at the Georgia Aquarium. One notable individual is "Nandi", a manta ray which was accidentally caught in shark nets off Durban, South Africa, in 2007. Rehabilitated and outgrowing her aquarium at uShaka Marine World, Nandi was moved to the larger Georgia Aquarium in August 2008, where she resides in its 23,848 m^{3} (6,300,000 US gal) "Ocean Voyager" exhibit. A second manta ray, "Tallulah", joined that aquarium's collection in September 2009 and a third was added in 2010.

The Atlantis resort on Paradise Island, Bahamas, hosted a manta named "Zeus" that was used as a research subject for three years until it was released in 2008.

=== Tourism ===
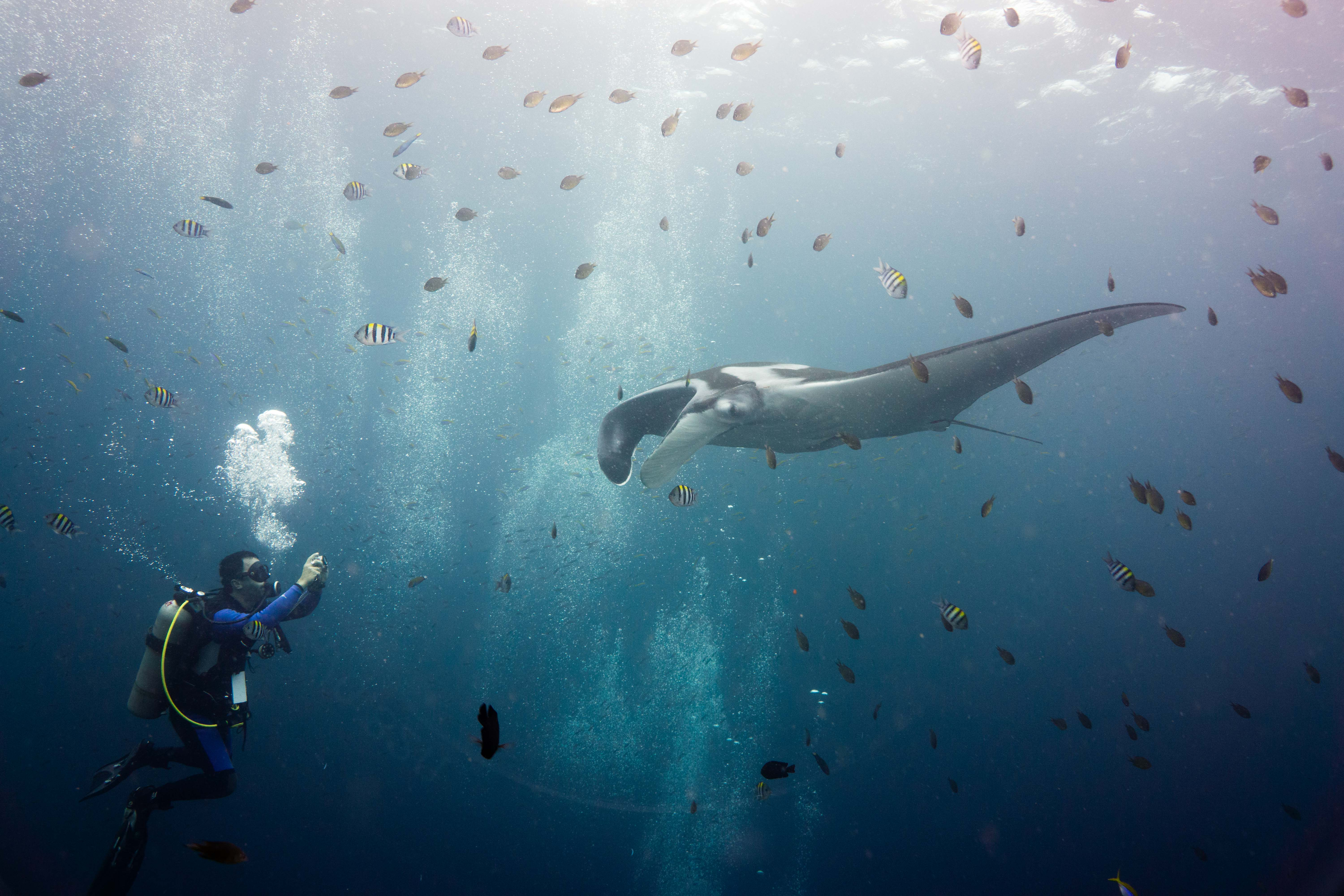
Manta birostris and scuba diver

Manta ray tourism is estimated to generate over US$73 million per year and brings US$140 million per year to local economies. The majority of global revenues come from ten countries: Japan, Indonesia, the Maldives, Mozambique, Thailand, Australia, Mexico, United States, the Federated States of Micronesia and Palau. Divers may get a chance to watch mantas visiting cleaning stations and night dives enable viewers to see mantas feeding on plankton attracted by the lights.

Ray tourism benefits locals and visitors by raising awareness of natural resource management and educating them about the animals. It can also provide funds for research and conservation. Constant unregulated interactions with tourists can negatively affect them by disrupting ecological relationships and increasing disease transmission.

In 2014, Indonesia banned fishing and export targeting mantas, as manta ray tourism is more economically beneficial than allowing them to be killed. A dead manta is worth $40 to $500, while the economic impact of tourism at a popular dive site can be $1 million per manta over its life, the most famous spot for Manta Ray spotting being Manta Point located on the Lesser Sundanese island of Labuan Bajo. Indonesia has 5.8 million km^{2} (2.2 million mi^{2}) of ocean, and this is now the world's largest sanctuary for manta rays.

== See also ==
- List of threatened rays
- Manta Matcher
