= Pygmy devil ray =

Pygmy devil ray is a common name for several fishes and may refer to:

- Mobula eregoodootenkee, native to the Indian and western Pacific Oceans
- Mobula munkiana, native to the eastern Pacific Ocean
