= Archaeomanta =

Archaeomanta Temporal range: Early Paleocene to Late Eocene

Scientific classification
- Kingdom: Animalia
- Phylum: Chordata
- Class: Chondrichthyes
- Subclass: Elasmobranchii
- Order: Myliobatiformes
- Family: Mobulidae
- Genus: †Archaeomanta; Cappetta, 1987

Species
- Archaeomanta melenhorsti Archaeomanta priemi

Extinct genus of cartilaginous fishes

Archaeomanta is an extinct genus of ray that lived from the Early Paleocene to the Late Eocene. It is one of the oldest known manta ray relatives. It is known from North Africa, the Middle East, the U.K., the U.S., and Uzbekistan.
