= Manta hynei =

Manta hynei Temporal range: Zanclean

Scientific classification
- Kingdom: Animalia
- Phylum: Chordata
- Class: Chondrichthyes
- Subclass: Elasmobranchii
- Order: Myliobatiformes
- Family: Mobulidae
- Genus: Manta
- Species: †M. hynei

Binomial name
- †Manta hynei Bourdon, 1999

Extinct species of cartilaginous fish

Manta hynei is an extinct species of manta ray that was extant in the Pliocene. Its fossils have been found in North America, specifically North Carolina and Virginia. It was first described by Jim Bourdon in 1999, as a specimen dated to the Zanclean (early Pliocene). The species is known from its distinctive fossilized teeth. Some authors have suggested, on the basis of tooth morphology, that this species should be classified in the genus Mobula instead.
