= Gill plate trade =

Buying and selling of stingray gill plates for use in alternative medicine

The gill plate trade is the buying and selling of stingray gill plates for their use in traditional Chinese medicine. The gill plates are harvested from stingrays that are caught intentionally, or caught as bycatch. The plates are sold whole or in a powder form. A single kilogram of the gill plate can be sold for up to US$350, though the price varies by ray species.

== Process ==
Stingrays are caught by fishing lines or nets. Private fishermen tend to target these ray species due to the high payout from their gill plates. Large fishing operations tend to catch rays as bycatch when fishing for more desirable food fish such as tuna, where they are brought back to shore and sold regardless of the intention to catch these fish. The gill plates are split in two and dried after they are taken from the dead rays. Once dried the plates are sold whole or ground into a powder.

== Uses in traditional Chinese medicine ==
Tonics made from stingray gill plates are used in traditional Chinese medicine, but there is no evidence of its effectiveness in any medical treatment.

== Impacts ==
=== On stingray populations ===
A few biological factors known as K-selected traits make the stingray more susceptible to population decline. These K-selected traits include, but are not limited to, late sexual maturity, long gestation, and low number of offspring. Because the gill plate trade will accept plates from both immature and mature rays, the number of rays that are able to reproduce is decreased by the capture of these animals. The population is slow to recover from these losses due to the K-selected traits and as fishing continues the population of stingrays decreases at a faster rate than it increases.

=== On other marine species ===
The gill plate trade affects other marine species in one of two ways. The first is the impact that the fishing has on these other species which inhabit the rays ecosystem is when rays are caught intentionally they are typically caught by longline fishing. Longline fishing involves thousands of baited hooks on one very long fishing line close to the ocean's surface. These hooks draw many species including birds, marine mammals, fish, sharks, and rays. The second impact of stingray fishing and population decline is an ecological effect. The stingrays are keystone predators in coral reef environments, when these species are declined the other reef species are effected through trophic factors, for instance predator populations decrease therefore prey populations increase, and risk effects. Risk effects are the behavioral mannerisms that prey learn to avoid predators, such as where or when to feed without becoming a meal for a predator. Without predators such as stingrays, the behavior of prey species is altered.

== Legislation ==
It is currently illegal to trade manta and mobula ray species without proper documentation that it is sustainable trade due to these species having been added to the CITES list. Once a species has been added to the CITES list it is internationally protected in legal trade; however, black market transactions still occur.
