= Burnhamia (devil ray) =

Burnhamia Temporal range: Thanetian–Bartonian

Scientific classification
- Kingdom: Animalia
- Phylum: Chordata
- Class: Chondrichthyes
- Subclass: Elasmobranchii
- Order: Myliobatiformes
- Family: Mobulidae
- Genus: †Burnhamia; Cappetta, 1976

Species
- B. daviesi; B. fetahi; B. crimensi; B. nessov

Prehistoric devil ray genus

Burnhamia is a genus of extinct devil rays from the Paleogene period. Due to superficial similarities, some species were originally mistaken for cownose rays and placed in the genus Rhinoptera. It is known exclusively from dental batteries, mostly isolated teeth. Several species are attributed to this genus, but their relationship to each other is still unresolved. Some have proposed the type species B. daviesi arises in the late Paleocene and persists until the middle Eocene, giving rise to the similar genus Eoplinthicus, with an earlier offshoot leading to smaller and less ornamented species in the lower Eocene, namely B. fetahi. B. fetahi is known from Morocco and North America. B. daviesi was described from the London Clay Formation, but is well known from Eocene deposits throughout Asia, Europe, North Africa, and North America. However, teeth from the Claiborne Group of Alabama show teeth identical to B. daviesi coexisting with Eoplinthicus in the Bartonian. A Ypresian species, B. nessovi, known from a singular site in Kazakhstan, was tentatively ascribed to the genus, though more material may show it warrants its own. B. crimensis is known from the Bartonian and Priabonian of Crimea.
