= Paramobula =

Scientific classification
- Kingdom: Animalia
- Phylum: Chordata
- Class: Chondrichthyes
- Subclass: Elasmobranchii
- Order: Myliobatiformes
- Family: Mobulidae
- Genus: †Paramobula; Pfeil, 1981
- Species: †P. fragilis

Binomial name
- †Paramobula fragilis (Cappetta, 1970)

Extinct genus of cartilaginous fishes

Paramobula is a genus of extinct rays in the family Mobulidae. The genus was erected by Pfeil in 1981 to accommodate a fossil species first described from a number of teeth with distinctive characteristics found in the Chandler Bridge Formation in South Carolina. The species was originally described by Cappetta in 1970 as Manta fragilis, but differed significantly from other Manta species. Paramobula fragilis dates back to the late Oligocene.
