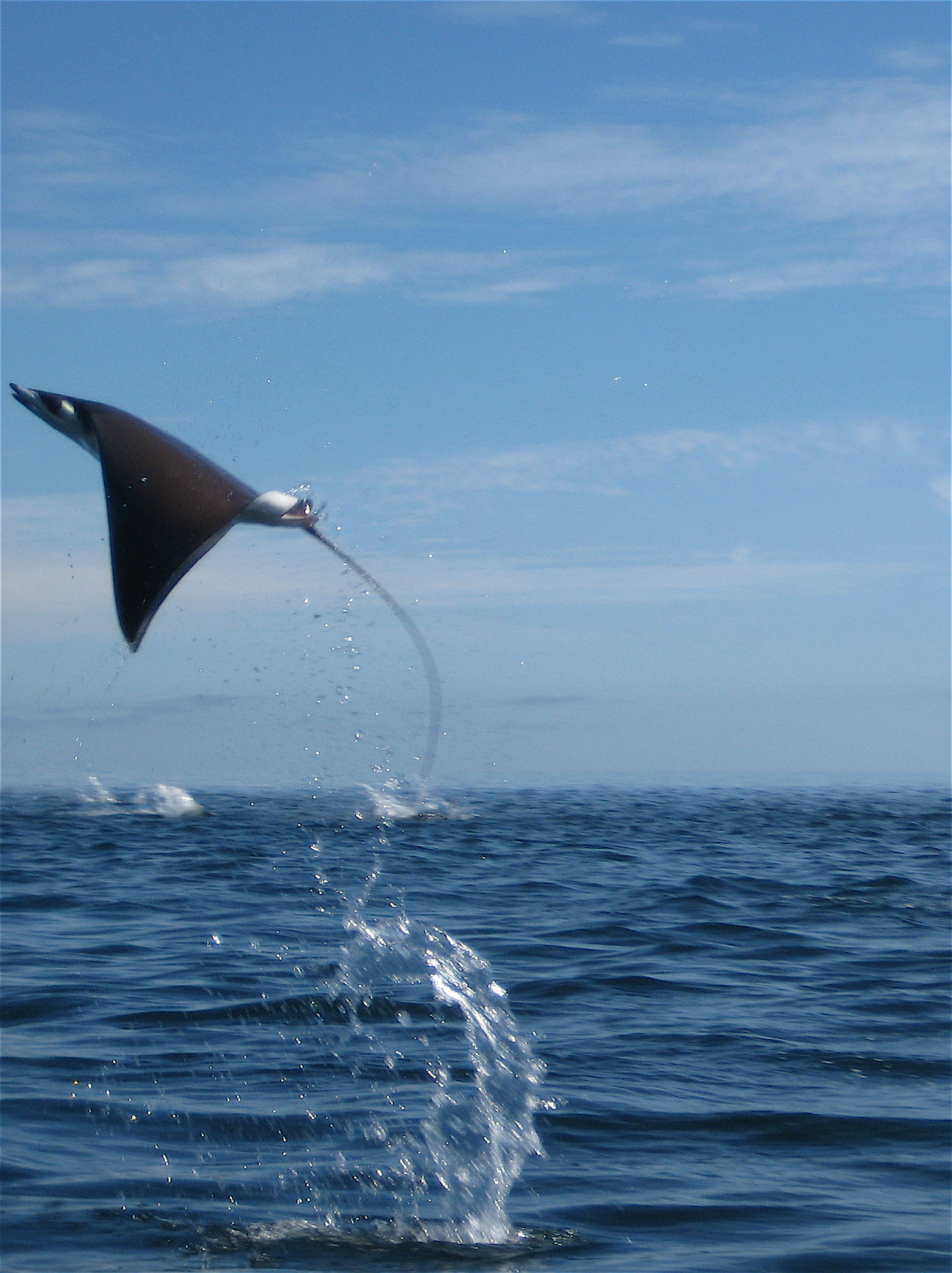

Conservation status
- Vulnerable (IUCN 3.1)
- CITES Appendix II

Scientific classification
- Kingdom: Animalia
- Phylum: Chordata
- Class: Chondrichthyes
- Subclass: Elasmobranchii
- Order: Myliobatiformes
- Family: Mobulidae
- Genus: Mobula
- Species: M. munkiana

Binomial name
- Mobula munkiana Notarbartolo di Sciara, 1987
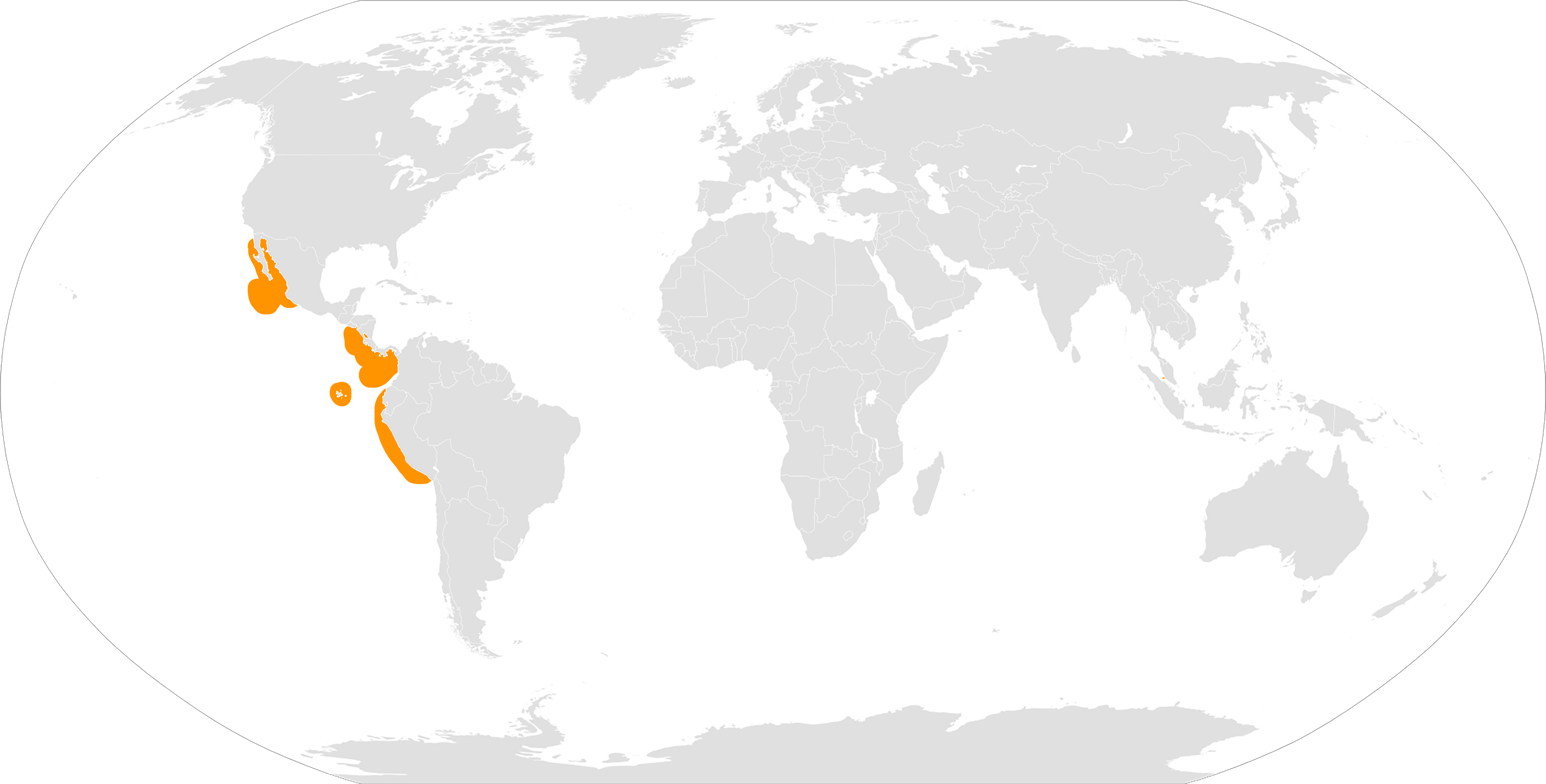

= Mobula munkiana =

Species of cartilaginous fish

Mobula munkiana, commonly known as the manta de monk, Munk's devil ray, pygmy devil ray, smoothtail mobula, or Munk's pygmy devil ray, is a species of ray in the family Mobulidae. They are commonly mistaken for their close relatives, M. thurstoni (bentfin devil ray) and M. mobular (giant devil ray). Although they are the smallest of the species in genus Mobula, they make up for their size with their incredible speed and agility. These characteristics are a likely explanation for their lack of natural predators, although they have been known to be hunted by orcas and are often fished by humans. One of the defining characteristics of this group are their acrobatic performances that are conducted while jumping in the air in schools of thousands. It is thought that these spectacles are a functional part of their lifestyle, including kickstarting mating rituals. The species was first described in 1987 after the Italian ecologist Giuseppe Notarbartolo di Sciara observed one of these acrobatic spectacles and decided to name them after his scientific mentor, Walter Munk.

== Description ==
Part of the elasmobranch division Batomorphi, pygmy devil rays are large fish with horizontally flattened bodies, bulging eyes on the sides of their heads, and gill slits on the underside. On either side of the central disc, the pygmy devil rays have wide, pointed pectoral fins with which they swim. Protruding from the front of their heads is a pair of fleshy lobes that enable them to funnel food into their mouths as they move through the water. They also have a small dorsal fin with a brownish to mauve-gray rim outlining a lighter gray area in the center, a long and slender tail, and no caudal spine. The upper surface of this fish is lavender-gray to a dark purple-gray, and the underside is white, tinged with gray towards the tips of the pectoral fins. Towards the head, they have a dark gray stripe that resembles the look of a collar. This species can grow up to a width of 1.1 metres (3.6 ft), making them the smallest species of devil ray (although they are only slightly smaller than M. hypostoma and M. kuhlii). The width size is a useful determining factor for the age of the ray. Neonates and juveniles are typically classified as less than 97 cm for females and less than 98 cm for males. The juveniles and neonates can be differentiated from one another because neonates still have an umbilical cord scar present.

== Distribution and habitat ==
Mobula munkiana rays are found in tropical parts of the eastern Pacific Ocean, ranging from the Gulf of California to Peru, as well as near offshore islands such as the Galapagos, Cocos, and Malpelo. They are often found in coastal waters near the surface or the seabed, likely in schools, but sometimes alone or in small groups. Most of their time is spent at the sea surface because this is where food sources are most abundant while in the open ocean. When they are in shallower waters during reproductive season, they tend to reside near the seabed where food congregates on the bottom. It is suspected that they are a migratory species, but their migratory movements are poorly understood and may relate to differences in the temperature of surface waters.

== Feeding ==
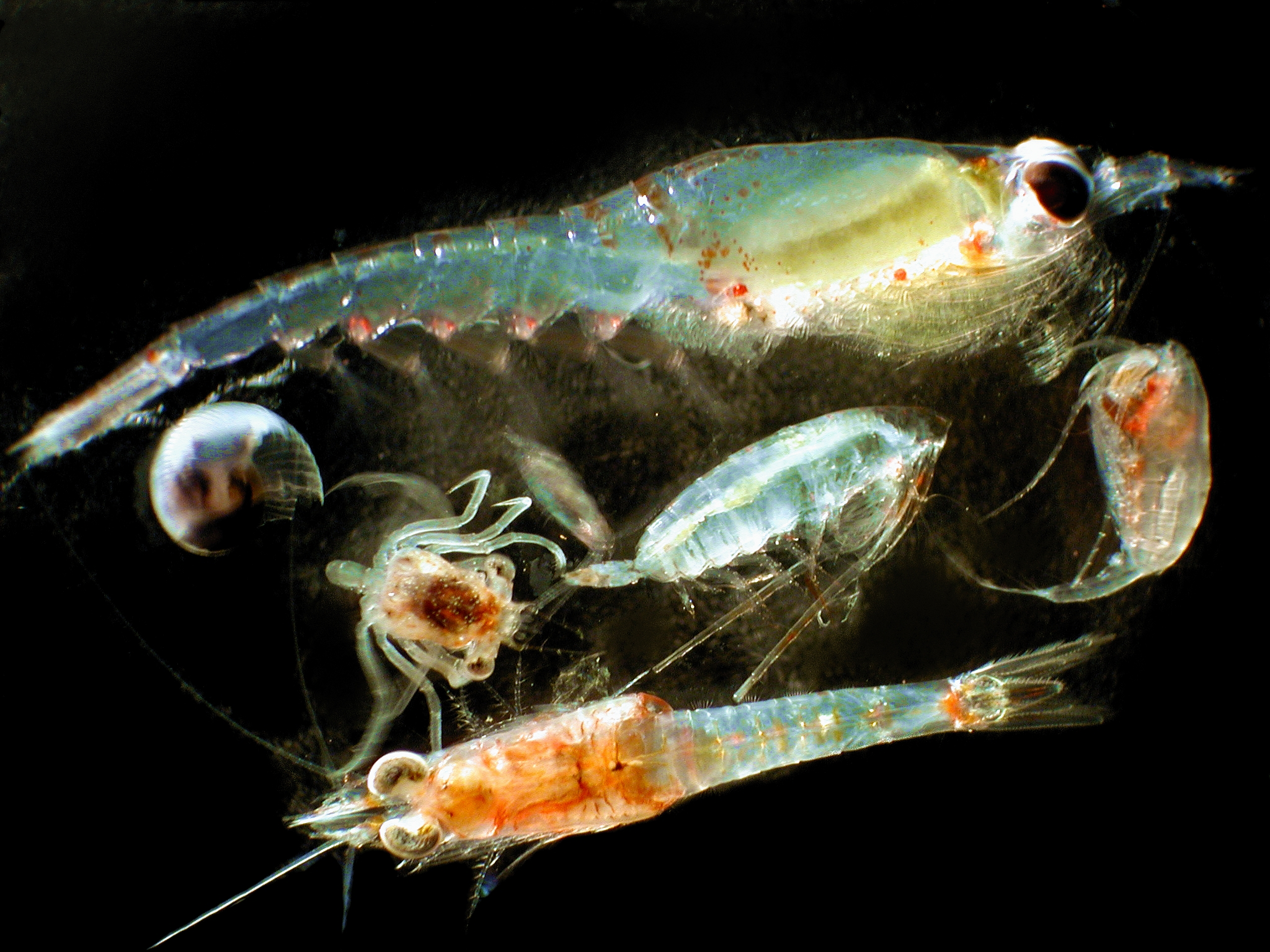
A close up of Munk's pygmy devil rays primary food source, zooplankton.

Munk's pygmy devil rays are pelagic planktivorous, which means they feed on plankton, specifically zooplankton. Additionally, they are known to eat mysids and krill. As the rays swim, water flows into their mouths and out through the gill slits, which filters out small particles and absorbs oxygen from the water. Alongside other devil ray species, they have filter pads that are covered with filter lobes. The M. munkiana specifically has a high number of goblet cells that secrete mucus along the epithical layer, which helps trap the food. Because of this type of filter feeding, they are often found in areas of massive upwelling, such as the Costa Rican Dome. The shallow breaking zones are their preferred area, as this is where zooplankton is usually most abundant.

== Reproduction and development ==
Mobula munkiana are known to exhibit a special type of mating ritual known as the "courtship vortex." During this process, individuals move in a clockwise motion for hours as mating groups move in and out of the vortex. It is suspected that this allows individuals to assess their potential mates before meeting on an individual basis. Once a male finds a female that they are interested in, they attempt to bite the female's pectoral fin. This behavior, common among the elasmobranchs, signals that they want to mate. To stop these unwanted advances, the females can curve their pectoral fins above their heads. These reproductive behaviors usually occur between the months of March and August, with a peak in May.

This species is ovoviviparous, meaning that the egg is hatched inside the mother. Only one egg is produced per reproductive cycle, exhibiting low birth rates in comparison to other elasmobranch species. Because of their low fecundity, it is crucial that the egg is well supported so they use a histotrophy reproductive strategy. The single developing young is at first sustained by the egg yolk and later receives nourishment from the uterine fluids in which it is immersed. Through this process, the embryo can receive needed nutrients. However, an excess of unwanted nutrients can become an issue as it can lead to developmental defects or improper growth that is harmful to the mother and the future of the embryo. When an individual is ready to be born, it is estimated that the birth size is around 35 to 43.3 cm.

After birth, there are certain conditions that enhance the probability of survival, such as warmer temperatures. It is thought that these temperatures may accelerate the metabolism and growth of juveniles, reducing the time that they are in a vulnerable state. Therefore, infants and juveniles are almost always found in shallow-coastal habitats with warm waters.

== Conservation status ==
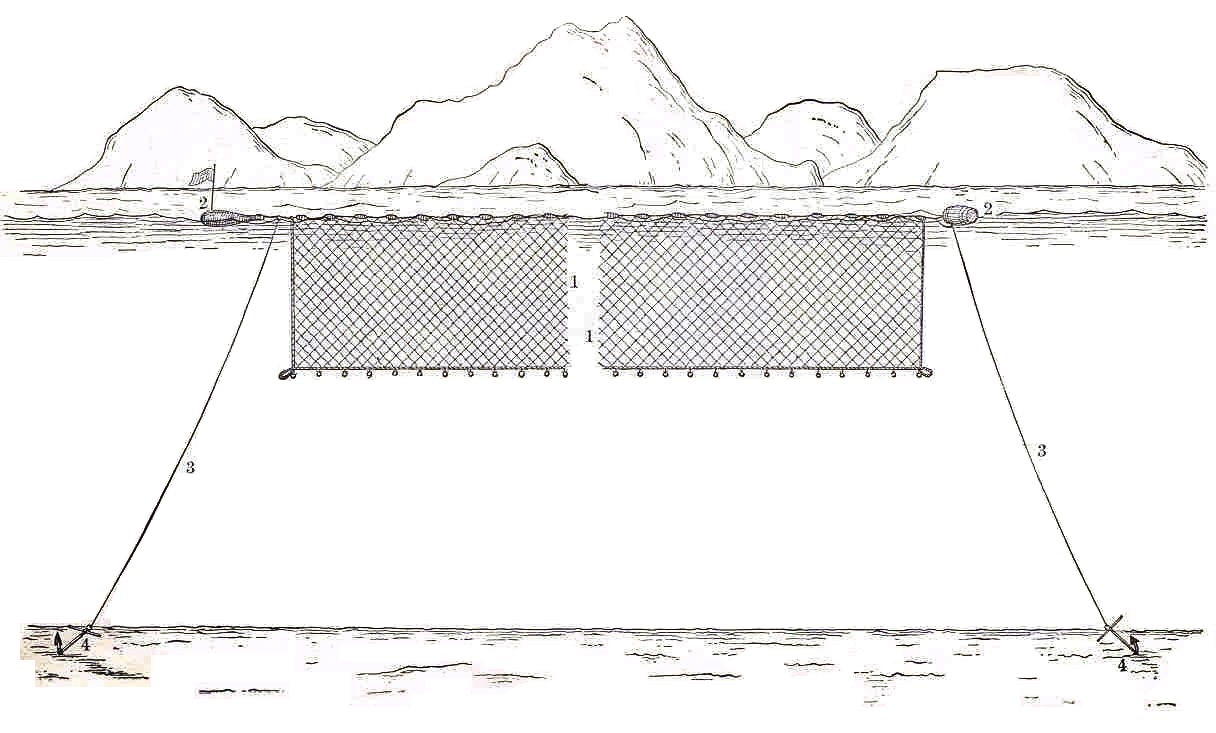
Typical structure of the gill nets that capture large numbers of rays as by-catch.

The International Union for Conservation of Nature rates the conservation status of Munk's devil ray as "vulnerable." This species does not have considerable provisional or cultural value to humans, so most of this decline is due to humans being careless. However, there are a handful of people who do find this species valuable. One reason is for their contribution to a dish known as "mantaraya tacos," which are made of Mobula munkiana meat. The gill plates have also been theorized to hold medicinal value in some Asian countries by detoxifying and filtering out diseases. There is no evidence to support this, but gill plates still continue to be sold at high prices.

Because this species is not often fished for its own value, their greatest threat is actually by-catch from fishermen gathering other commercial species. Mature adults are more likely to be caught in the catch, decreasing the population demographic that contributes the most to population growth. Because their reproductive areas are in shallow waters near the coast, they are also susceptible to coastal development, sound pollution, chemical pollution, habitat loss, and boat strikes. These external issues, combined with their low fecundity, long reproductive cycles, and filter feeding, make them more susceptible to contaminants. Schooling habits also add to their decline because large numbers can be caught at once in gill nets and trawls. All of these factors contribute to a growing concern for this species.

Due to these conservation concerns, Munk's pygmy devil rays are protected under many international and national laws, such as the Convention on the Conservation of Migratory Species of Wild Animals, the Convention on International Trade in Endangered Species of Wild Flora and Fauna, the Inter-American Tropical Tuna Commission, and the national decree No. 38027-MAG that prohibits any fishery, onboard retention, landing, or commercialization of mobula rays. However, due to the similarities between mobular species, it is difficult to correctly enforce conservation measures for a particular species because they are often mistaken for one another. To support enforcement for Mobula munkiana specifically, more research is being done to correctly identify and locate the species. Some of this new research includes DNA barcoding that provides a more accurate assessment of the proportion of mobuild species being caught in small-scale fisheries. As technology and environmental awareness continue to advance, there is hope that the M. munkiana populations will stabilize in the near future.
