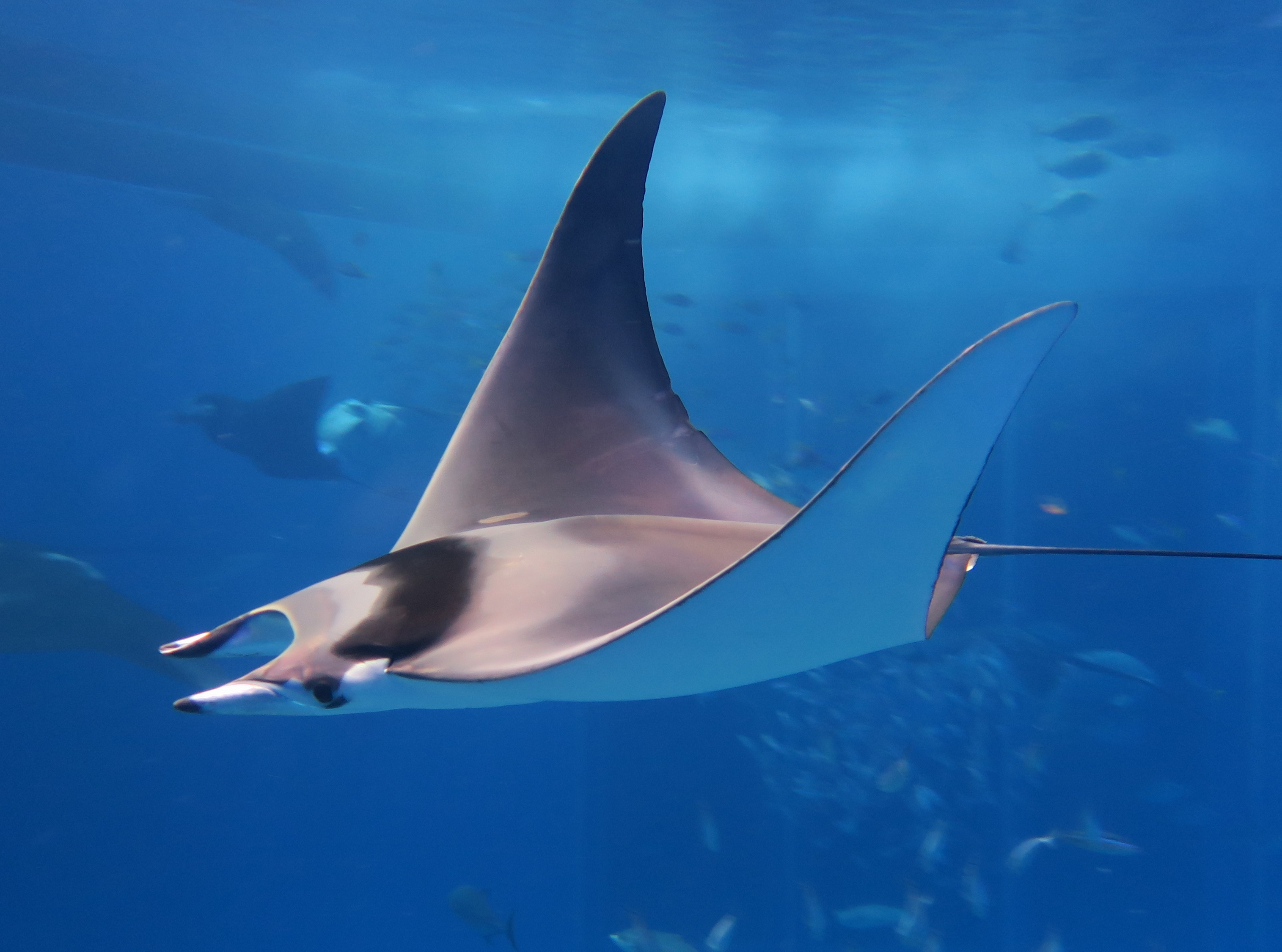
- Exhibited individuals at Osaka Aquarium

Conservation status
- Near Threatened (IUCN 3.1)
- CITES Appendix II

Scientific classification
- Kingdom: Animalia
- Phylum: Chordata
- Class: Chondrichthyes
- Subclass: Elasmobranchii
- Order: Myliobatiformes
- Family: Mobulidae
- Genus: Mobula
- Species: M. japanica

Binomial name
- Mobula japanica (J. P. Müller & Henle, 1841)

Synonyms
- Cephaloptera japanica Müller & Henle, 1841; Mobula japonica (Müller & Henle, 1841); Mobula mobular (Bonnaterre, 1788)

= Spinetail mobula =

Species of cartilaginous fish

The spinetail mobula (Mobula japanica), also known as the spinetail devil ray or Japanese mobula ray, is a species of pelagic marine fish which belongs to the family Mobulidae. The spinetail mobula gets its name due to its devil like appearance from the "horns" on its head and the unique spines on its tail. Generally, these rays love to be mobile and show off their aerial acrobatics. M. japanica can be found throughout the tropical and sub-tropical waters of the Indo-Pacific and eastern Atlantic Ocean.

== Taxonomy ==
Mobula japanica falls under the order Myliobatiformes and family Mobulidae. The Mobulidae family is a family of rays, manta rays and devilfish specifically, consisting of 11 species. The IUCN suggests that M. japanica should be considered conspecific with the devil fish (Mobula mobular) Recently a study found very low genetic divergence between M. mobular and north-west Pacific, north-east Pacific, Indian and east Atlantic ocean populations of M. japanica, which taken together with a lack of substantive morphological differences challenges their separation into two different species.

== Description ==
The spinetail mobula ray is a large ray which can grow up to a maximal width of 3.1 m (10 ft); average width is 2.3 m (7 ft 7 in). Like most rays, it is dorsoventrally flattened, also known as a depressed body form, and has relatively large triangular pectoral fins on either side of the main body disc that sit slightly convex. At the front, it has a pair of cephalic fins which are forward extensions of the pectoral fins. These can be rolled up in a spiral for swimming or can be flared out to channel water into the ventral mouth when the animal is feeding. M. japanica's eyes sit on the side of the head, while the mouth is on the underside for convenient filter feeding as it swims through the ocean.

The background body coloration of the dorsal side is deep blue-mauve with a large black band stretches from eye to eye. The ventral side is white. The inner surface of the cephalic fins are silver-grey with black tips, while the outer surface and side behind eye are white. The coloration of M. japanica serves as protection from predators, such as larger sharks and killer whales, both above and below them in the water column. When looking down, their dark dorsal slide allows them to blend in with the deep blue below and when looking up, their white ventral side allows them to appear homogenous with the lighter surface hit with sunlight.

Mobula japanica is often mistaken for its relative, the giant manta ray (M. birostris), however the species can be distinguished from other large rays by its projecting head, narrower head and body, subterminal mouth, small spine at the base of the tail, a white-tipped dorsal fin. Its spiracle is just above the area where the pectoral fin meets the body.

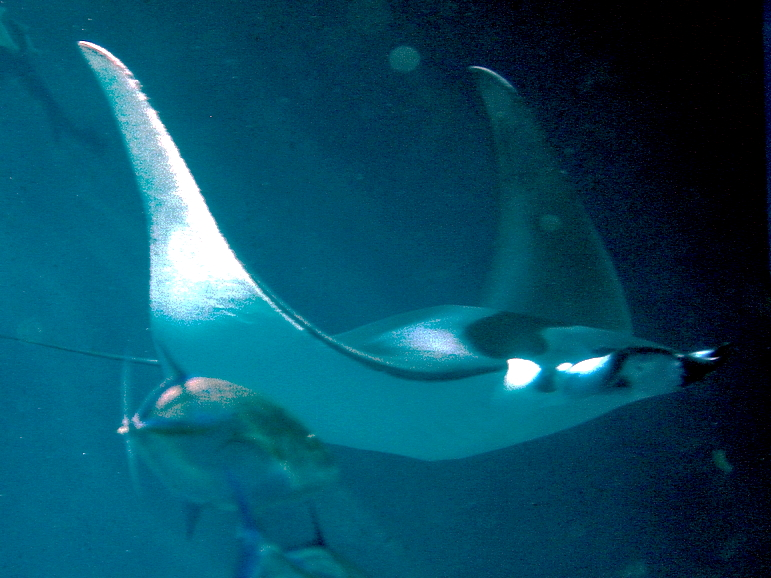
Spinetail Mobula Ray (M. japanica)

== Distribution and movement ==
The spinetail mobula is a mobile species, usually traveling in small groups together. They are assumed to have a circumglobal distribution in tropical and temperate waters, both inshore and offshore and fully oceanic. Their widely distributed pattern has to do with factors such as food availability and water column dynamics, with which they adapt accordingly based on the surrounding ecosystem and environment. The southern Gulf of California appears to be an important mating and pupping ground.

Limited studies have shown that they have a preference for more warm and shallow waters like the Gulf of Mexico, Mediterranean Sea, and southwest Pacific Ocean. However, one study in particular found that despite their "preference", the spinetail mobula distribution is directly related to seasonal upwelling systems with high productivity in the cold coastal waters, such as the eastern Pacific Ocean. Ultimately, their movement is dictated by environmental conditions that affect the zooplankton they follow. This makes them highly susceptible to environmental changes such as ocean acidification and global warming. During the months before summer, many individuals of M. japanica inhabit the continental shelf before migrating to tropical waters for the rest of the year. Although many studies have been done, spatial constraints and low sample sizes prohibit full understanding of the relationship between the rays' spatial distribution and the conditions of the environment around them.

A recent study following the depth and temperatures at which these organisms reach within a 24 hour time period shows that M. japanica spend the days in deeper waters and then undergo a nocturnal migration to the surface at night to feed.

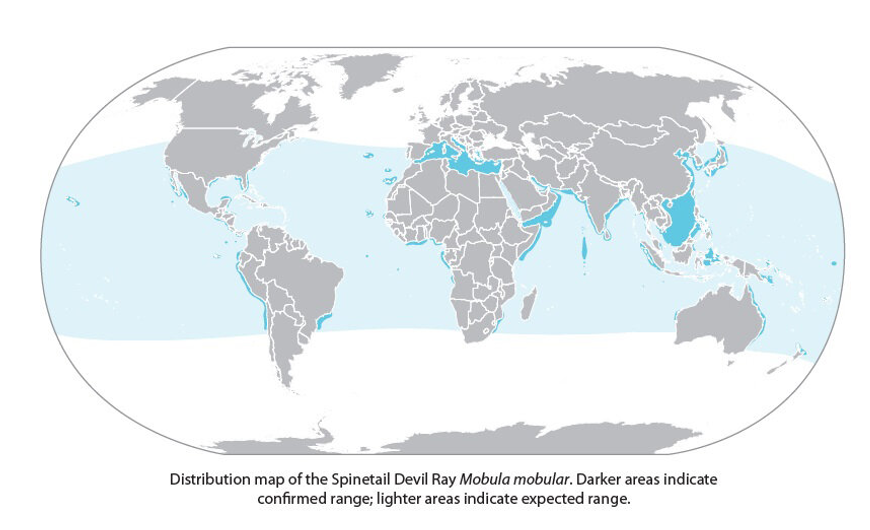
M. japanica Global Distribution Map

== Feeding ==
Mobula japanica is a filter feeder, meaning they feed on small organisms, such as zooplankton or small crustaceans, by straining nutrient rich water through their system. As previously mentioned, their movement is highly correlated to the food abundance causing them to readily move up and down the water column. During upwelling events, spinetail mobula rays rush to the coasts and take advantage of the boost in zooplankton and nutrient abundance.

Scientists conducted a study that measured the diversity and abundance of a random group of M. japanica. This provided a better understanding for the specific details of the spinetail mobula ray's diet. The study found 5 different groups that made up the stomach contents: decapods, copepods, gastropods, Polychaeta and other prey. With decapods being the highest percentage, at 99.54%, their label as plankton filter feeders is further confirmed. They are classified as omnivorous animals, yet can be carnivorous if given the opportunity.

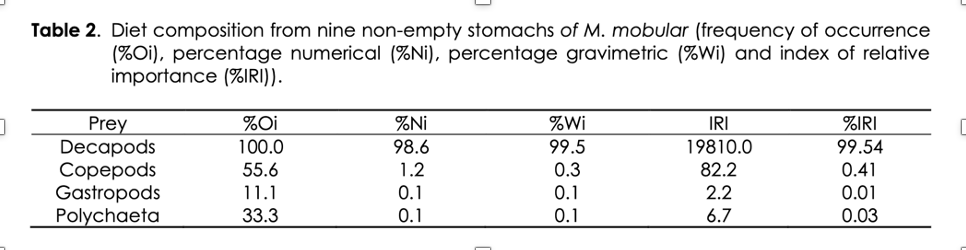
M. japanica Diet Breakdown

== Biology ==
The spinetail mobula ray has a pelagic lifestyle and has been observed both alone and in groups. It feeds on zooplankton by filtering sea water.

As all Mobulidae, species is ovoviviparous. After mating, the fertilized eggs develop within the female's oviduct. At first, they are enclosed in an egg case while the developing embryos feed on the yolk. After the egg hatches, the pup remains in the oviduct and receives nourishment from a milky secretion. The pup is 70–85 cm (28–33 in) in disc width at birth. Females typically only give birth to one pup.

They have low somatic growth rate, low annual reproductive output, and low maximum population growth rates, suggesting they have low productivity.

== Threats and conservation ==
The spinetail mobula is threatened by both targeted and accidental capture in various fishing methods. Despite conservation efforts, global landings of these rays have risen due to gill plate demand. The gill plates are used in traditional medicines to treat a range of ailments, including cancer. Commercial and artisanal fisheries target M. japanica in their warm water habitats. In addition, this species is also a victim of bycatch, getting caught in gill and trawl nets intended for other species.

Furthermore, due to their movement around the world being tied closely to the environment that influences the distribution of zooplankton, they are more susceptible to environmental changes such as ocean acidification and global warming. The effects of climate change can throw off natural systems and processes that drive zooplankton abundance in many parts of the world, which then in turn would affect M. japanica by stretching the geographic ranges by which they comfortably live or by changing them biologically to adapt to these new conditions. Especially due to their low reproductive rates, late maturity and slow growth, the spinetail mobula ray is particularly vulnerable and it would take a while to recover from depletion or exploitation.

Additionally, habitat destruction and pollution pose indirect threats to their survival. However, with more push for legislation to protect our oceans and Earth in general, this species could still reap the benefits of that.

Voters have the power to spark more conservation efforts under laws and policies. For example, spinetail mobula rays are protected under the Wildlife Act of 1953 in New Zealand's territory. Hunting, killing, or harming devil rays in general can lead to up to $250,000 and six months in prison. If more places around the world could adopt policies like this, we could see drastic change in the conservation status of M. japanica and other rays.
