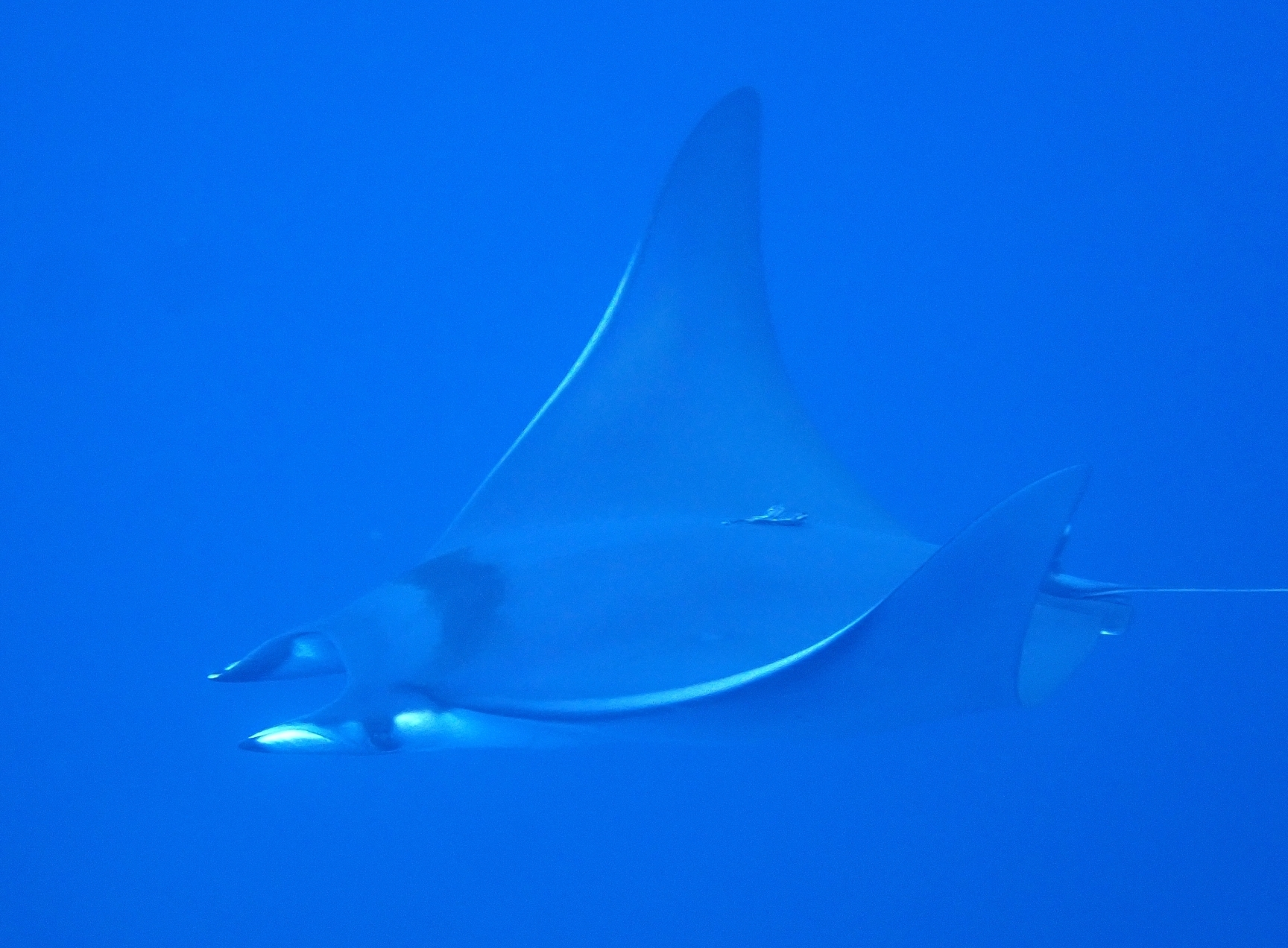
- A bentfin devil ray off Santa Cruz de Tenerife, Canary Islands

Conservation status
- Critically Endangered (IUCN 3.1)
- CITES Appendix II

Scientific classification
- Kingdom: Animalia
- Phylum: Chordata
- Class: Chondrichthyes
- Subclass: Elasmobranchii
- Order: Myliobatiformes
- Family: Mobulidae
- Genus: Mobula
- Species: M. thurstoni

Binomial name
- Mobula thurstoni (Lloyd, 1908)

= Bentfin devil ray =

Species of cartilaginous fish

The bentfin devil ray (Mobula thurstoni), also known as the lesser devil ray, smoothtail devil ray, smoothtail mobula or Thurston's devil ray, is a species of ray in the family Mobulidae. It is found worldwide in tropical, subtropical and warm temperate oceans, with records from Australia, Brazil, Chile, Costa Rica, Ecuador, Egypt, El Salvador, Eritrea, Guatemala, Honduras, India, Indonesia, Ivory Coast, Japan, Malaysia, Maldives, Mexico, Myanmar, Nicaragua, Oman, Pakistan, Peru, the Philippines, Saudi Arabia, Senegal, South Africa, Sri Lanka, Thailand, United Arab Emirates, United States (California), Uruguay, Vanuatu and throughout the central and western Pacific. It likely occurs in many other locations in tropical, subtropical and warm temperate oceans. It is found both offshore and near the coast.

== Description ==
The bentfin devil ray can reach a disc width of 189 cm (6.2 ft) and weigh about 54 kg (120 lb). The length of the disc is about 1.95 times its width. The front edge of the disc is nearly straight near the snout, but curves sinuously as it approaches the broad, triangular pectoral fins. The back edge is concave, becoming straight as it approaches the tail. On either side of the snout are cephalic flaps, and the mouth is on the underside of the head. The dorsal fin is about 80% as high as it is long. The length of the tail is between half the disc width and the whole disc width, and the tail does not bear a spine. The upper surface of this ray varies from dark grey to olive-gray, and the under surface is white. The rear of the tip of the pectoral fins is black and the front edge of these fins is white, as is the tip of the dorsal fin.

== Distribution and habitat ==
This species is probably circumglobal, and has been recorded from tropical and sub-tropical waters in the Atlantic Ocean, the Indian Ocean and the Pacific Ocean. In inshore waters it is mainly pelagic, seldom going as deep as 100 m (330 ft).

== Ecology ==
Like other closely related species, the bentfin devil ray feeds on plankton. It funnels water into its mouth as it swims. The ray filters plankton from the water through its gill rakers. In the Gulf of California, the commonest item in the diet is Nyctiphanes simplex, a species of krill, but this fish also feeds seasonally on opossum shrimps.

== Status ==
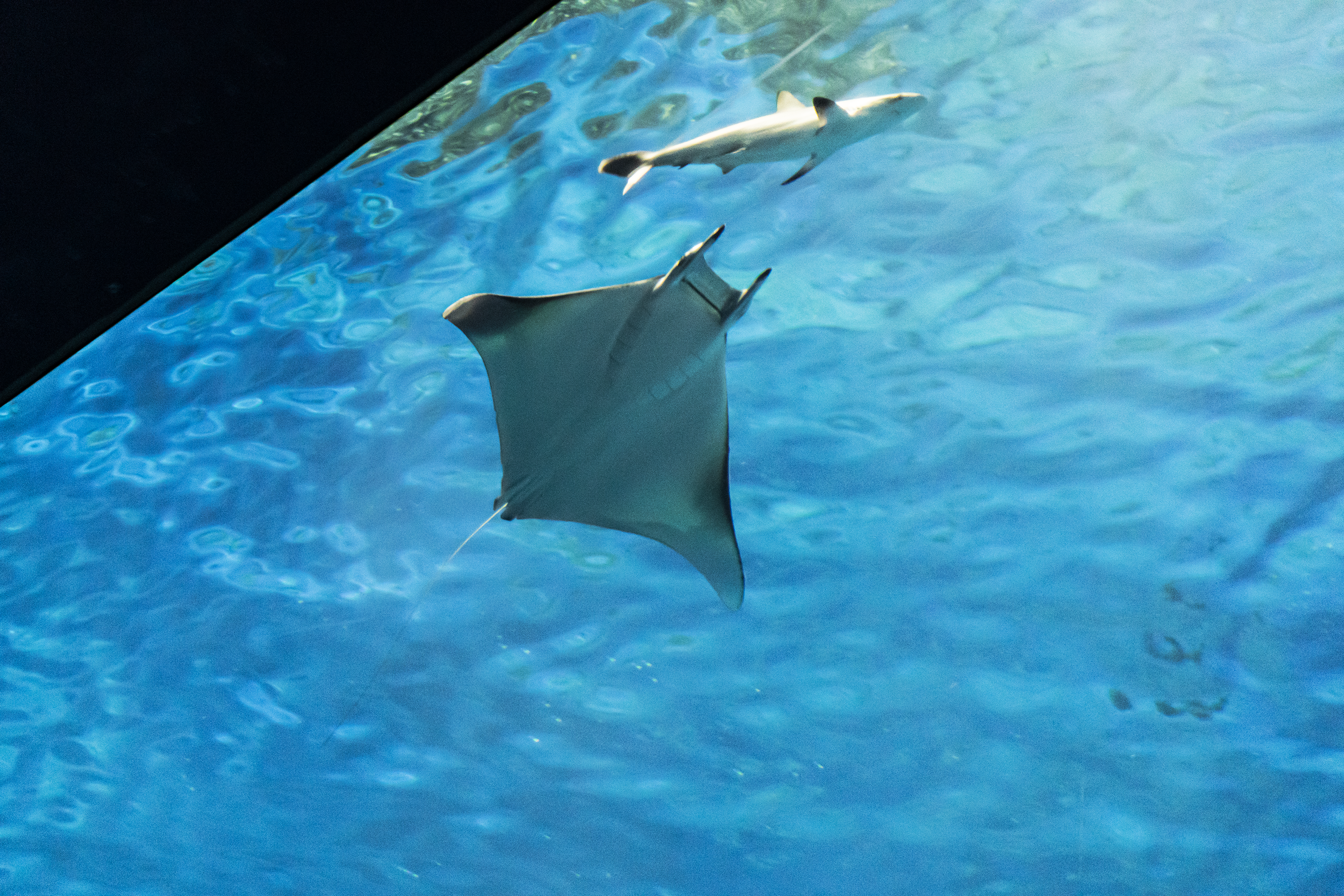
swimming rays

Mobula thurstoni is a large fish with a high age at maturity and a low fecundity rate, producing a single pup at a time. Although it has a wide range, it is targeted by fisheries in some regions and is caught as bycatch in gill nets and by trawling in others. There are reports of landings in Indonesia, the Philippines, Mexico and Brazil, and it is likely that it is landed in other places like West Africa. In eastern Asia the gill rakers are valued in addition to the flesh. The population trend is unknown but the fish is reported as uncommon. For these reasons, the International Union for Conservation of Nature has rated its conservation status as being "endangered".
