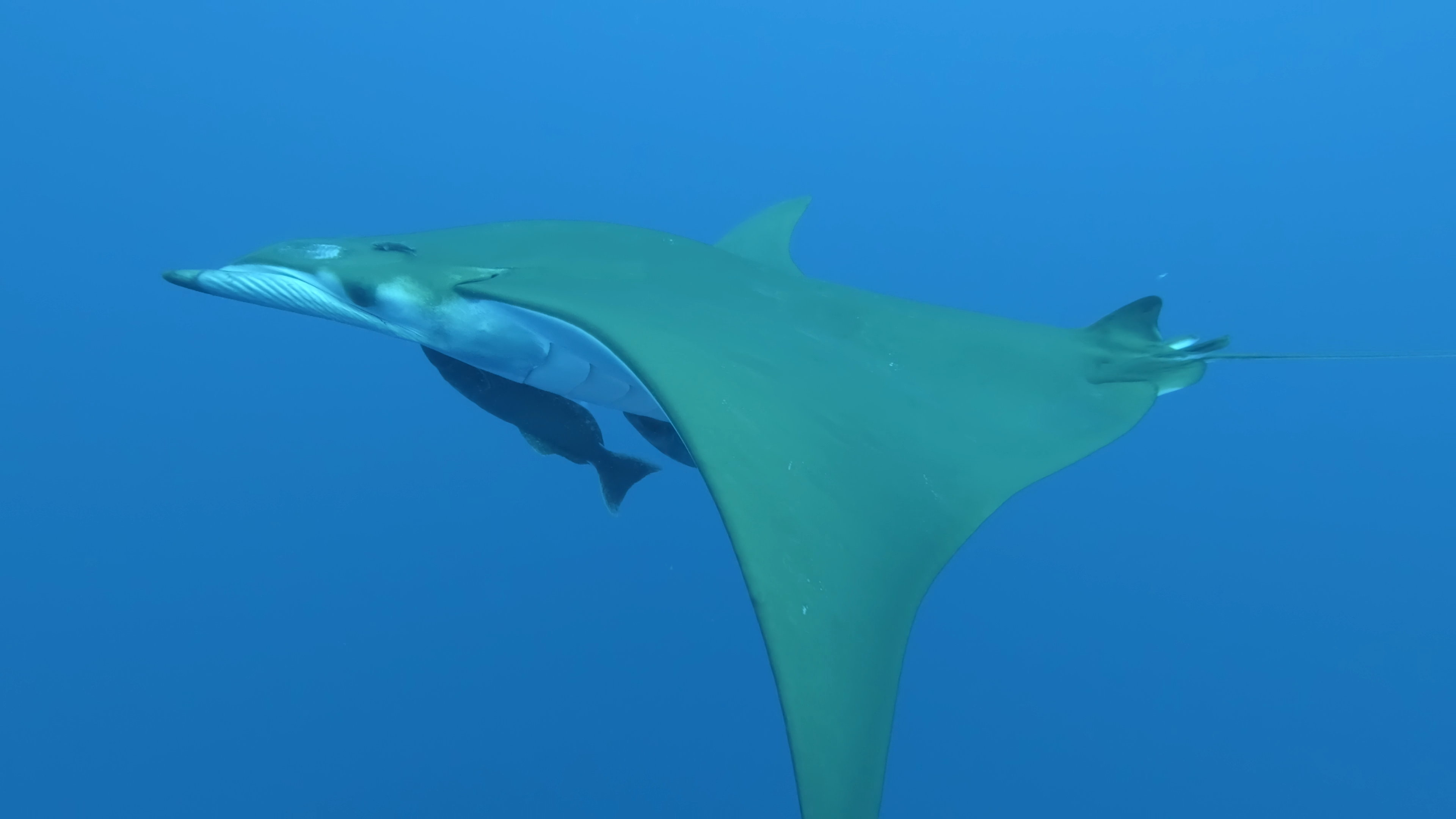

Conservation status
- Critically Endangered (IUCN 3.1)
- CITES Appendix II

Scientific classification
- Kingdom: Animalia
- Phylum: Chordata
- Class: Chondrichthyes
- Subclass: Elasmobranchii
- Order: Myliobatiformes
- Family: Mobulidae
- Genus: Mobula
- Species: M. tarapacana

Binomial name
- Mobula tarapacana (Philippi {Krumweide}, 1892)

= Chilean devil ray =

Species of cartilaginous fish

== Overview ==
The Chilean devil ray (Mobula tarapacana), also known as the box ray, greater Guinean mobula, sicklefin devil ray or the spiny mobula, is a species of ray in the family Mobulidae. It is often observed worldwide, basking just below the surface in tropical, subtropical and warm temperate oceans, mainly offshore, and occasionally appearing near the coast. It can reach a disc width of up to 3.7 m (12 ft).

== Anatomy ==
Chilean Devil Rays are recognized by their unique boxy and rectangular head shape, which is different from other rays who have more rounded heads. They also have a pale patch behind their heads, which is used as a good identifier for the species. Their bodies are disc-shaped and are flat. Furthermore, these rays have a specialized gill rack filter pad which is used to help strain microscopic zooplankton from the water they take in. Also, they have special cephalic fins, which are long, finger- like structures on their heads which are used to help zooplankton channel into their mouths.

== Habitat ==
The Chilean devil Ray lives in warm temperate to tropic oceanic waters across the Atlantic, Pacific, and Indian Oceans. They mostly are pelagic, swimming in the open ocean, but also inhabiting areas near continental shelves, and oceanic islands. Their range typically extends from the northeastern United States and the Caribbean to Japan and Australia, and as far as South Africa and the Maldives. They have been known to make long distance migrations across the Atlantic often.

== Diet/ Feeding ==
Where Chilean Sea Devils are located

The Chilean Devil Ray is a planktivorous filter feeder, which means they eat small organisms, including zooplankton, copepods, krill, and other small crustaceans . They swim with their mouths open to suck in water, which passes over their gills which traps the small organisms in and then lets the water out. They typically feed near surface waters where the plankton concentrations are the highest. Due to their prey being so small, they need to eat frequently and often.

== Breaching and Diving Behavior ==
Chilean Devil Rays are most famously known for their aerial displays, which is of them leaping out of the water. They can propel themselves multiple feet into the air, and sometimes land on their backs. This is thought to be used for communication, parasite removal, or just simply playing around.

Originally believed to be surface dwellers, Mobula tarapacana have been discovered to feed at depths of up to 1,896 metres (6,220 ft) during deep dives; they are among the deepest-diving ocean animals. Their dives often follow a stepwise pattern, in which the ray dives deeply, then works its way back up by repeatedly "levelling up" for a bit and then moving higher. Sonar observations suggest that rays level up where there are denser layers of prey, suggesting that this is a foraging behavior.They make these deep water dives usually at night, when scavenging for prey.

Rays display two distinct deep-dive patterns. The stepwise dive pattern, which is usually only performed once every 24 hours, involves diving to the maximum depth and resurfacing after 60 to 90 minutes; a second pattern, which is less frequent, involves diving up to 1,000 meters for a maximum of 11 hours. The latter pattern may be associated with traveling rather than feeding.

The ray's behavior may be linked to an organ called the retia mirabilia, which is found in rays and in deep-diving great white sharks. A veined structure of blood vessels warms the ray's brain at colder depths. Rays stay near warmer surface water for at least an hour both before and after deep diving, suggesting that they are soaking up heat to prepare for and recover from their descent into colder water.

== Population Status and Conservation ==
As large marine species that feed low in the food chain, they are very important for the overall health of the ecosystems they inhabit. As they can be found as an indicator species, the loss or decrease in population size of these devil rays can lead to serious damage, like loss in biodiversity. Pollution and climate change are also impacting their prey availability and overall health of their environments.

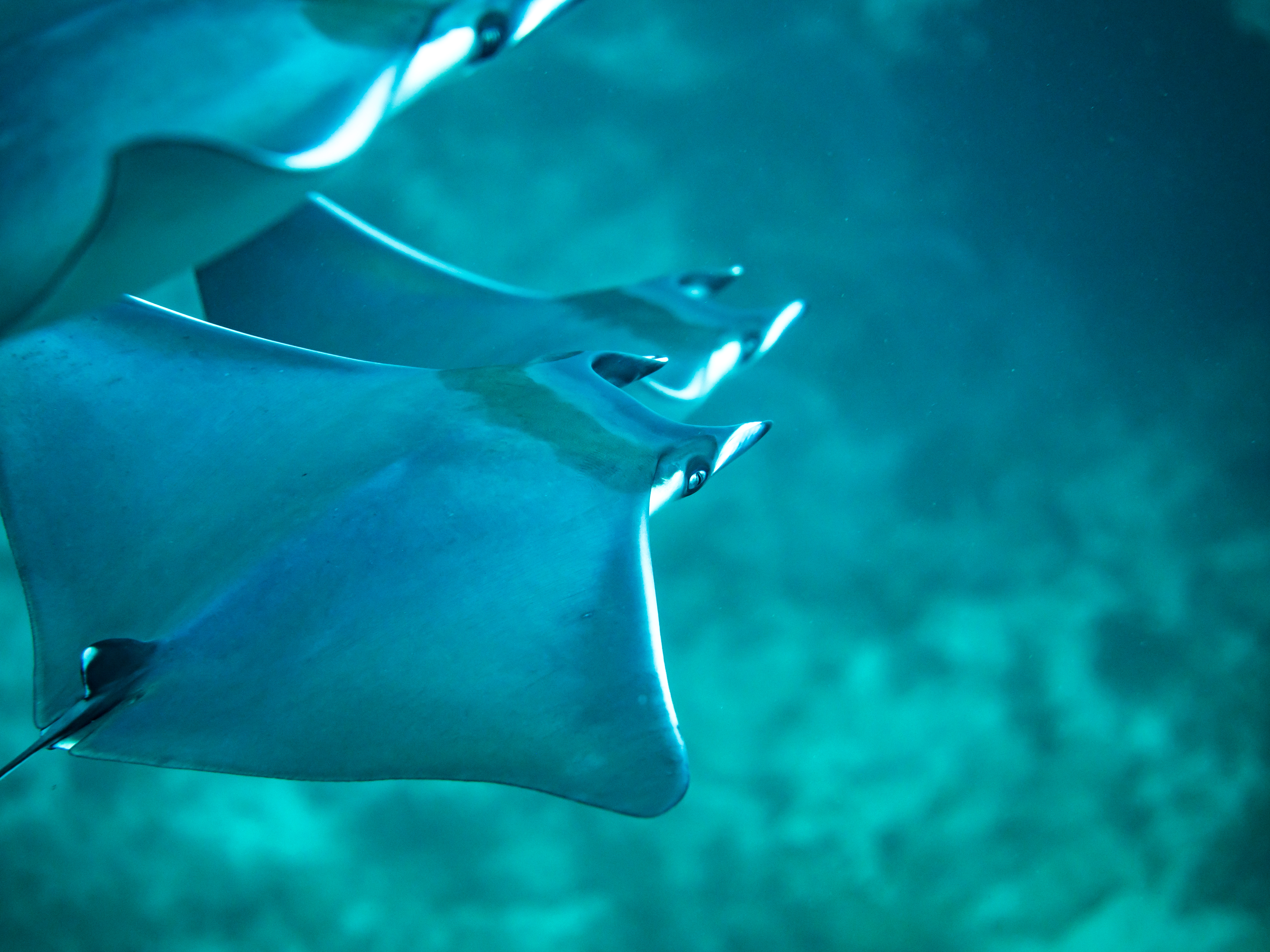
Group of Chilean Devil Rays (Mobula tarapacana)

Chilean Devil Rays are classified as Critically Endangered, as their populations have been decreasing. This change in population size is requiring conservation attention to help them out. One of their biggest threats is being bycatch in gill net and trawlfisheries, which can be accidental, but they are also targeted in the demand for traditional Asian medicines. This is decreasing their populations rapidly. Researchers are finding new programs and ways to help improve the understanding of their population dynamics and management strategies.
