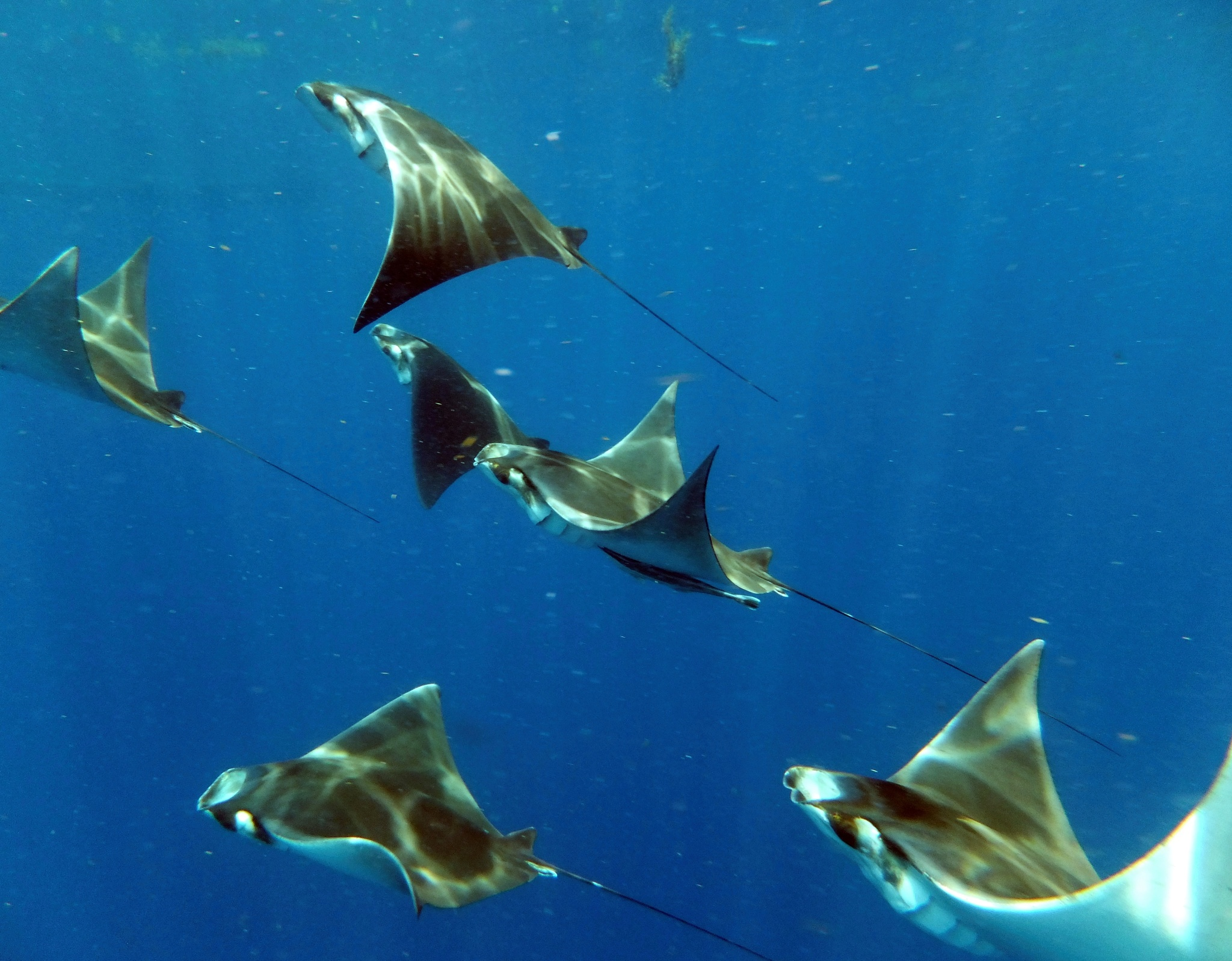
- A group of lesser devil rays off Cancún, Mexico.

Conservation status
- Endangered (IUCN 3.1)
- CITES Appendix II

Scientific classification
- Kingdom: Animalia
- Phylum: Chordata
- Class: Chondrichthyes
- Subclass: Elasmobranchii
- Order: Myliobatiformes
- Family: Mobulidae
- Genus: Mobula
- Species: M. hypostoma

Binomial name
- Mobula hypostoma (Bancroft, 1831)
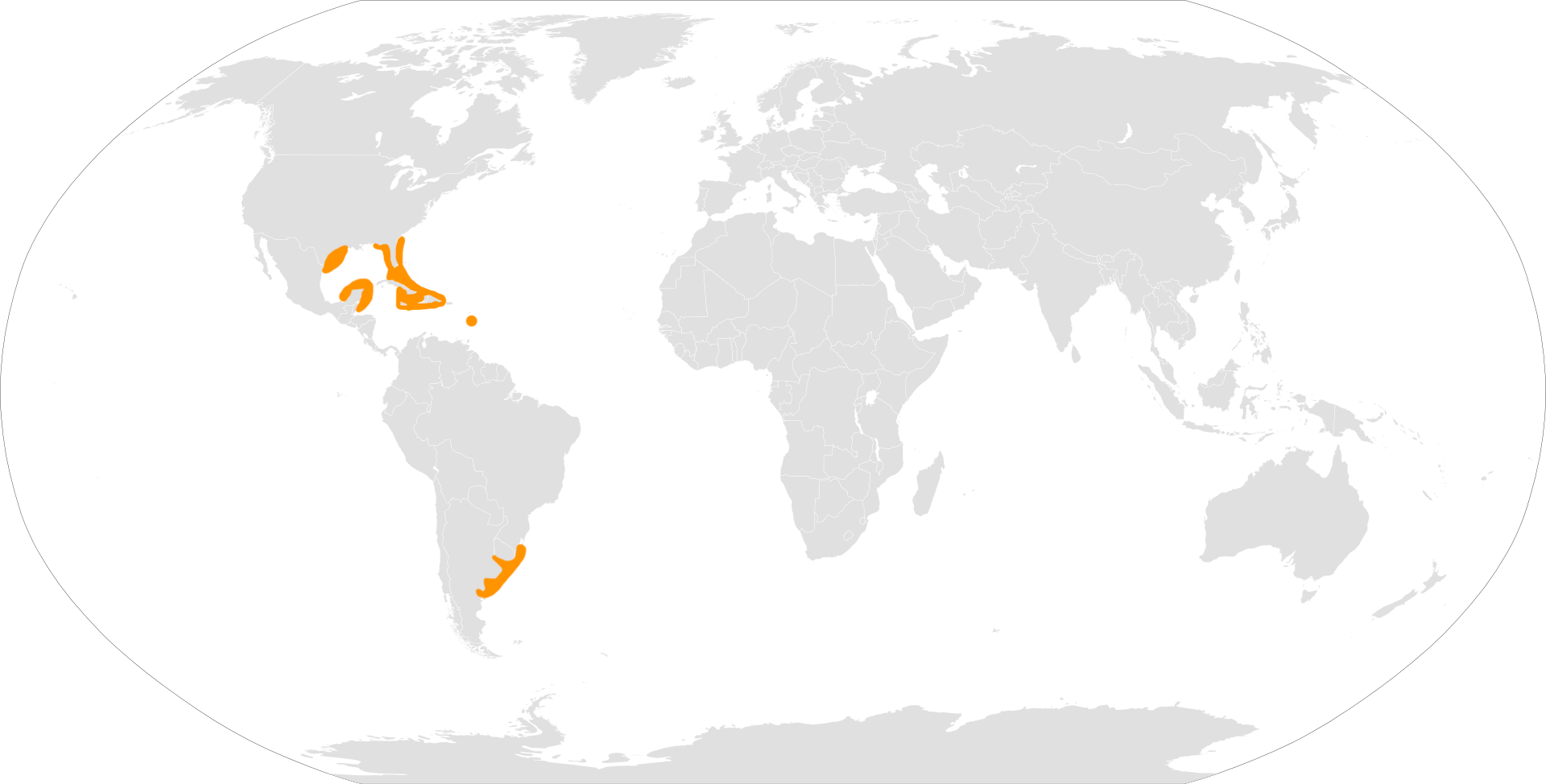
- Range of Mobula hypostoma, not including M. rochebrunei

Synonyms
- Cephalopterus hypostomus; Cephaloptera massenoidea; Cephaloptera olfersii; Ceratobatis robertsi; Ceratobatic robertsii; Mobula olfersii; Mobula reobertsi; Mobula rochebrunei?

= Lesser devil ray =

Species of cartilaginous fish

The lesser devil ray (Mobula hypostoma) is a species of devil ray in the family Mobulidae.

== Habitat ==
These rays live in shallow, warm waters and can be found in shoals of up to 40 individuals, although more often ranging between 2 and 10.

They occur along the coasts of the western Atlantic, from North Carolina to northern Argentina. The related Mobula rochebrunei has occasionally been recovered as a junior synonym of M. hypostoma, extending the species' range to the eastern Atlantic.

== Diet ==
They mostly feed on zooplankton such as small crustaceans, although they can occasionally eat schooling fish, using their cephalic horns to funnel prey into their mouth.

== Description ==
Lesser devil rays are relatively small, with a maximum width of about 125 cm (49 in). They have forward-facing cephalic horns, while their long spineless tails distinguish them from their relatives M. mobular.

Dorsal coloration varies from light brown to black, although some specimens have been reported as blue. Individuals sometimes possess a dark grey collar between their spiracles.
