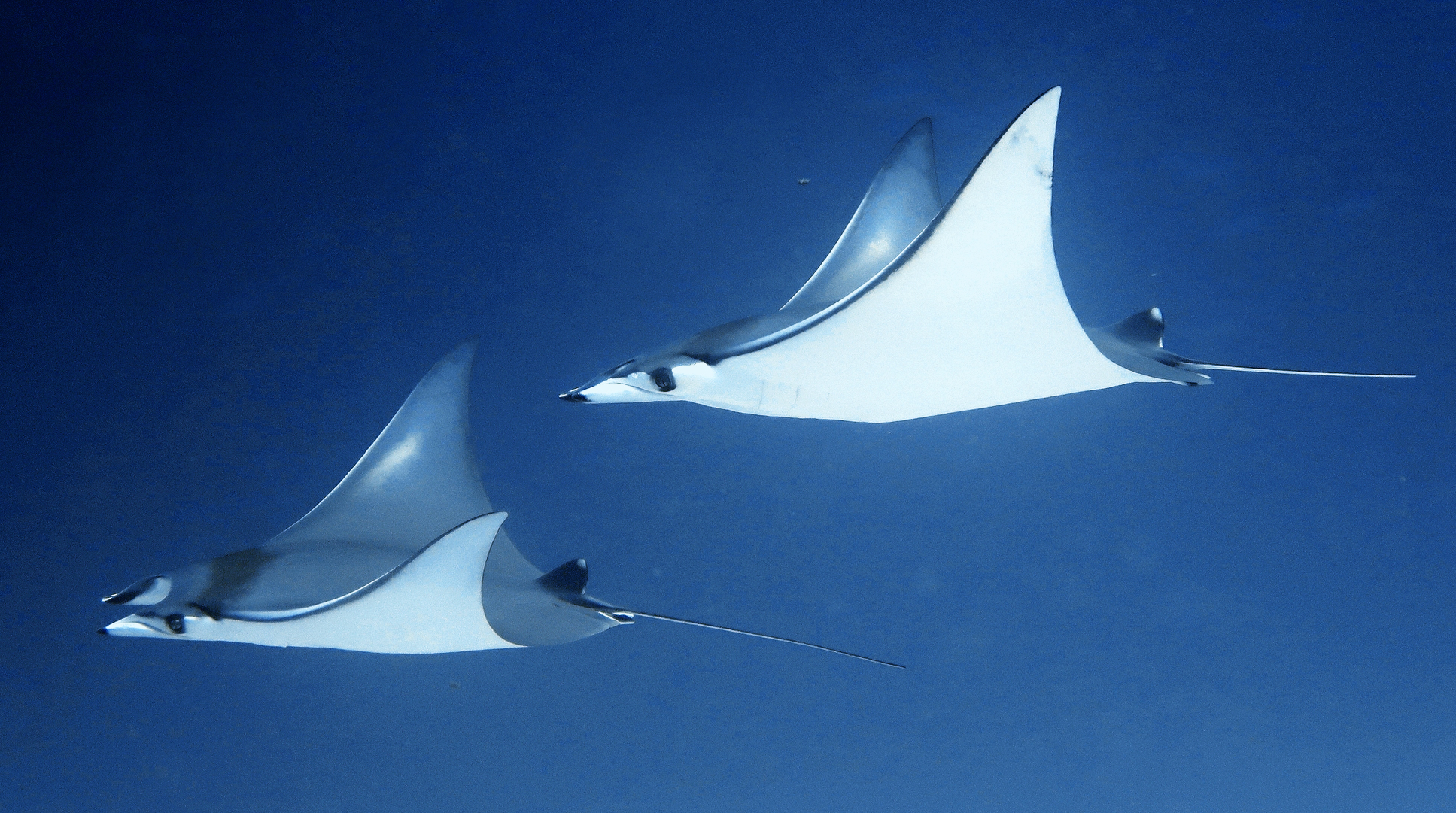
- Two shortfin devil rays off Ukulhas, Maldives

Conservation status
- Endangered (IUCN 3.1)
- CITES Appendix II

Scientific classification
- Kingdom: Animalia
- Phylum: Chordata
- Class: Chondrichthyes
- Subclass: Elasmobranchii
- Order: Myliobatiformes
- Family: Mobulidae
- Genus: Mobula
- Species: M. kuhlii

Binomial name
- Mobula kuhlii (Valenciennes, 1841)

Synonyms
- Cephaloptera kuhlii Valenciennes, 1841; Dicerobatis draco Günther, 1872; Cephaloptera eregoodootenkee Bleeker, 1859; Mobula eregoodootenkee Bleeker, 1859

= Mobula kuhlii =

Species of cartilaginous fish

Mobula kuhlii, the shortfin devil ray, is a species of ray in the family Mobulidae. It is endemic to the Indian Ocean and central-west Pacific Ocean. It ranges from South Africa, Mozambique, Tanzania and the Seychelles in the west to the Philippines and Indonesia in the east, and southward to the northern coast of Australia.

== Description ==
The shortfin devil ray is a small eagle ray growing to a maximum width of 120 cm (47 in) and a weight of 30 kilograms (66 lb). It is flattened horizontally with a wide central disc and the head is short with small cephalic fins. The large pectoral fins have curved tips and the dorsal fin has a white tip. The tail is not tipped with a spine and is shorter than the body. The dorsal surface of this fish is brown and does not bear any placoid scales, and the ventral surface is white.

== Biology ==
The shortfin devil ray feeds on plankton and possibly also on small fish and squid. It gathers its food by swimming with its mouth open and passing the water over its gill rakers which filter out the food particles. It is an ovoviviparous fish and has the lowest rate of reproduction of any of the elasmobranchs. A litter usually consists of a single pup and the gestation period is one to three years.

== Status ==
The International Union for Conservation of Nature have classified the conservation status of this species as endangered. This is because the shortfin devil ray is the subject of both targeted and bycatch inshore fisheries. It is vulnerable to over-fishing because of its low reproductive rate. Targeted fisheries occur in India, Sri Lanka and Thailand, and this ray is caught in Indonesia especially for its gill rakers. These are valuable because of their use in traditional Chinese medicine. The flesh is used for human consumption, the skin is dried and deep fried, and the cartilage is used as a filler in the manufacture of shark fin soup.
