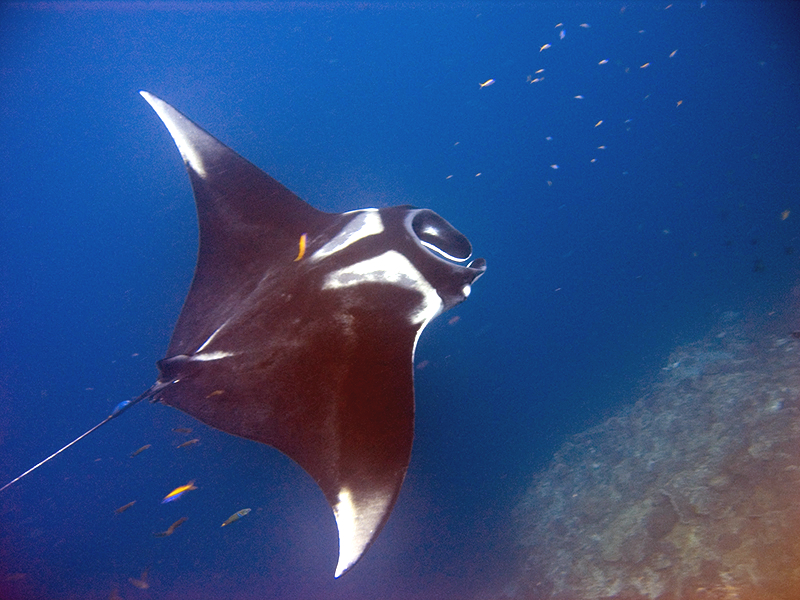
- Mobula birostris at Hin Daeng, Thailand

Scientific classification
- Kingdom: Animalia
- Phylum: Chordata
- Class: Chondrichthyes
- Subclass: Elasmobranchii
- Division: Batomorphi
- Order: Myliobatiformes
- Family: Mobulidae; Gill, 1893

Genera
- Mobula; Manta (Now considered to be a synonym of Mobula)

= Mobulidae =

Mobulidae Temporal range: Early Paleocene to recent Possible Late Cretaceous record

Family of cartilaginous fishes

The Mobulidae are a family of cartilaginous fish that includes both devil rays (Mobula) and manta rays, most members of this family are large species living in the open ocean rather than on the sea bottom.

== Taxonomy ==
The Mobulidae have been variously considered a subfamily of the Myliobatidae by some authors, and a distinct family by others, though recent work favors the latter interpretation. Two genera within the family have been traditionally recognized, Manta and Mobula, but recent DNA analysis shows that Mobula is paraphyletic to manta rays, making Manta a junior synonym of Mobula and Mobula the only extant genus of the family.

== Fossil record ==
Several genera of fossil mobulids are known from teeth, including Archaeomanta, Burnhamia, Eomobula, and Paramobula. The earliest records of mobulids are of Archaeomanta from the Early Paleocene. A potentially earlier record may be Cretomanta from the mid-Cretaceous, but this genus may represent a planktivorous shark potentially related to Aquilolamna.
