= Madonie Regional Natural Park =

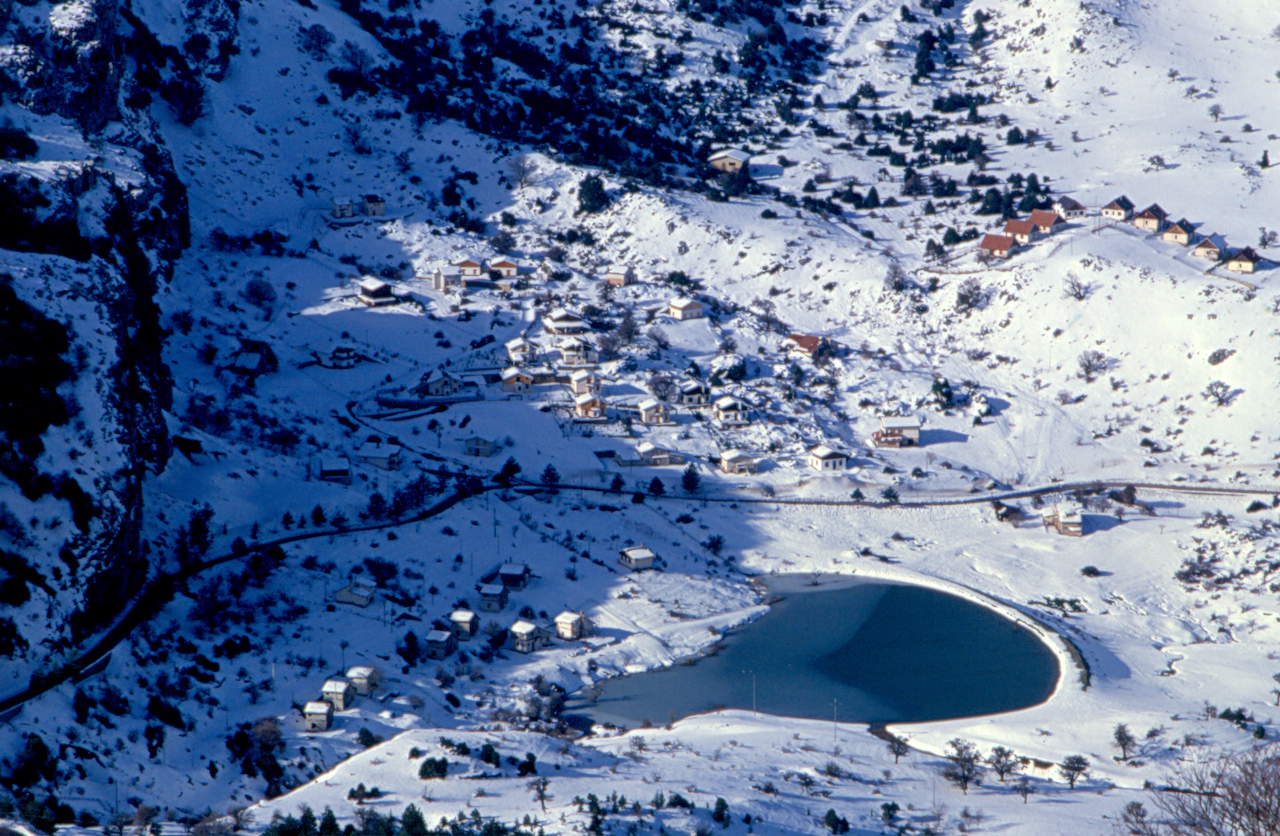
- The Madonie Mountains

- Location within Sicily
- Location: Palermo Province, Sicily, Italy
- Coordinates: 37°53′N 14°01′E
- Area: 161.76 km^{2} (62.46 sq mi)
- Established: 1989

The Madonie Regional Natural Park (Italian: Parco delle Madonie) is an Italian regional park located in Sicily, between Palermo and Cefalù and covers 39,972 acres (161.76 square kilometres; 62.46 square miles).

== Geography ==
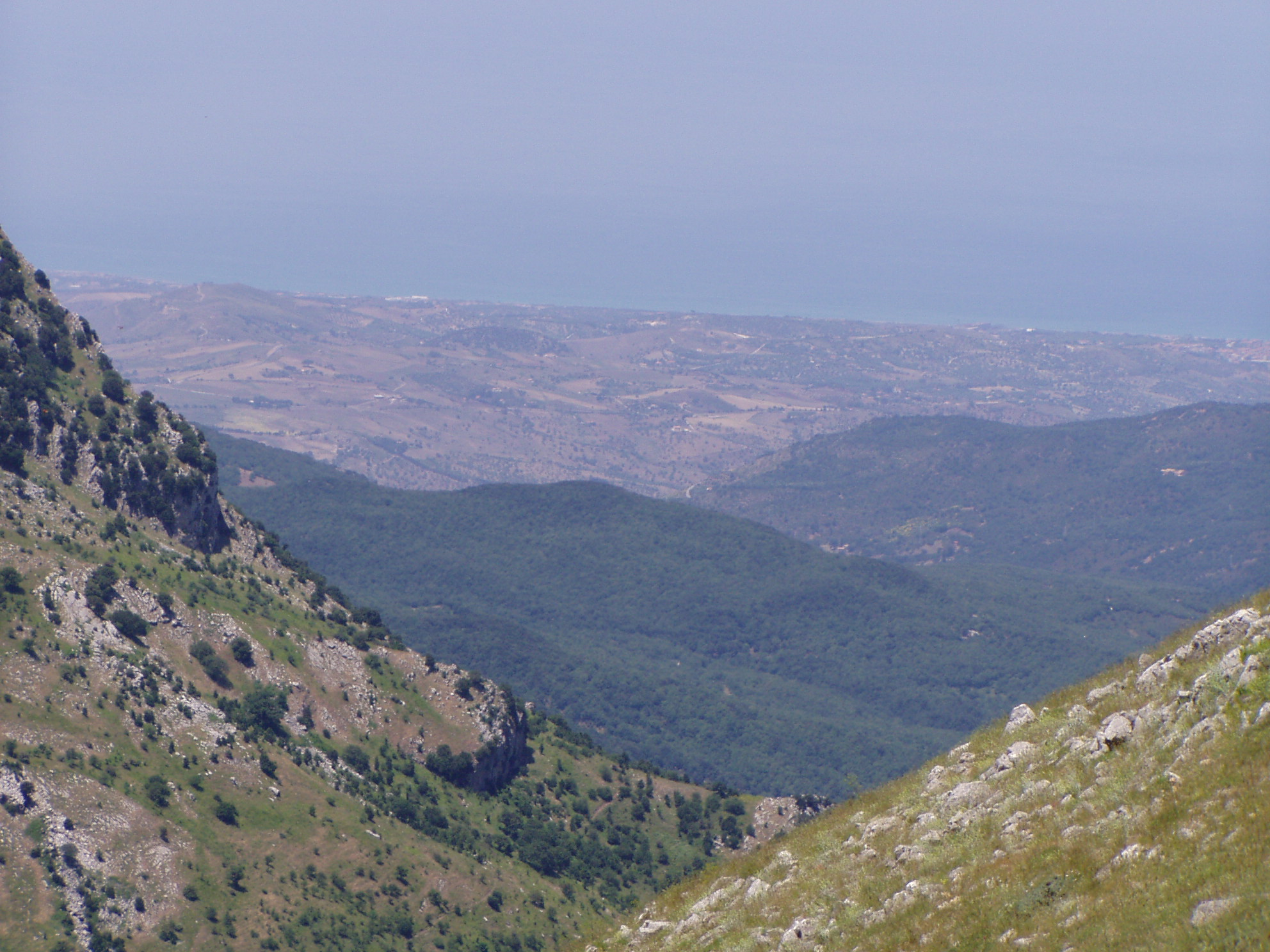
View in Madonie Park

It includes the Madonie mountain range and some of the highest mountains in Sicily. The park has six mountains that are over 1,500 metres (4,900 feet) and many more that are over 1,000 metres (3,300 ft). The highest is Pizzo Carbonara at 1,979 metres (6,493 feet), second in height in Sicily only to Mount Etna.

As well as being a nature reserve, the park is an inhabited area with dozens of little villages and small towns, many of which trace their origins to medieval times. The park is also home to a number of castles and numerous ancient churches.

The wild mountainous slopes are inhabited by fallow deer (were introduced in the 1980s), wild boar, red fox, rabbits, wildcats and Bonelli's eagles, as well as being a habitat to the rare, nearly-extinct Nebrodi fir tree. One of the park's most notable natural features is the extensive forest of beech trees found only at 1,500 metres (4,900 feet) and above. These are the most southerly beech forests in Europe. Lower down, below 1,600 metres (5,200 feet), there are large forests of holm oak, downy oak and cork oak, and around Castelbuono and Pollina the rare manna ash is still farmed. The mountains contain some 1500 species and sub-species of plants, around 60% of all those found in Sicily. These include more than 70 different species of orchid.

== History ==
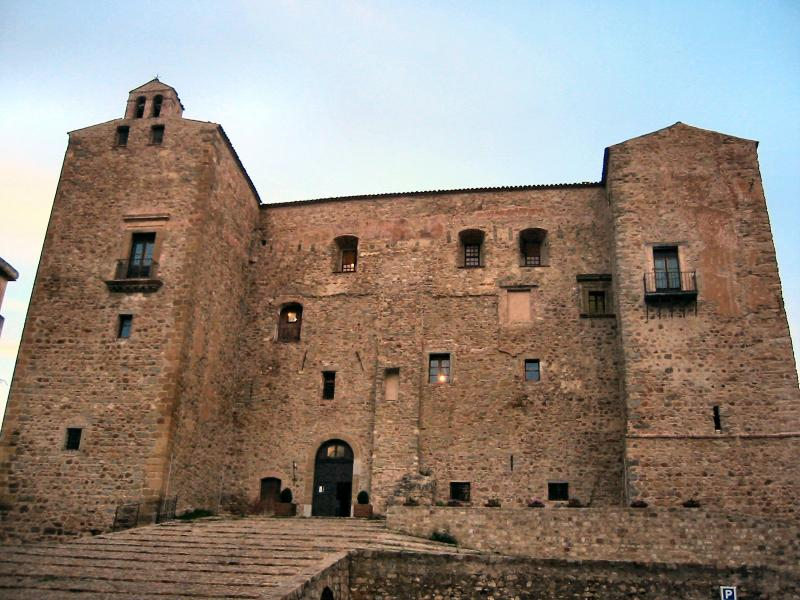
Castelbuono – The Castle.

The regional park was officially created on 9 November 1989. Within the park area there are outcrops of rocks which have been dated at over a 200-million-year period and represent all aspects of the geology of Sicily apart from the current volcanic activity. The collaboration of the Madonie Park authorities and the European Geoparks Network has allowed the research of students and lecturers of the University of Palermo's Department of Geology and Geodesy. Studies have been made, papers published, and educational paths mapped out, with signs erected with information on the ground. Madonie Geopark is a member of the European Geoparks Network and the UNESCO Global Geoparks Network.

The park comprises fifteen municipalities of the province of Palermo: (Caltavuturo, Castelbuono, Castellana Sicula, Cefalù, Collesano, Geraci Siculo, Gratteri, Isnello, Petralia Soprana, Petralia Sottana, Polizzi Generosa, Pollina, San Mauro Castelverde, Scillato and Sclafani Bagni).
