= Isnello =

Isnello Asínes (Greek)
- Comune
- Comune di Isnello
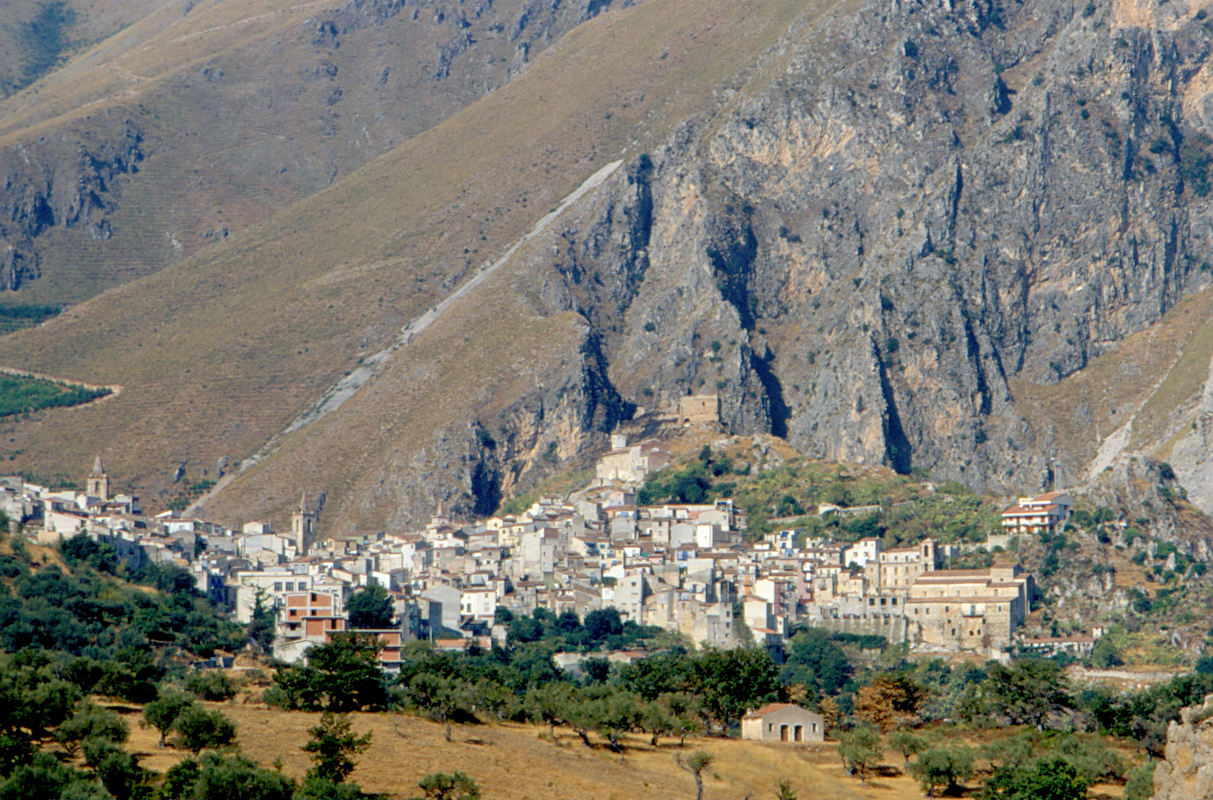

- Location within Italy Location within Sicily
- Coordinates: 37°57′N 14°1′E
- Country: Italy
- Region: Sicily
- Metropolitan city: Palermo (PA)
- Frazioni: Piano Zucchi

Government
  - Mayor: Marcello Catanzaro

Area
  - Total: 50.2 km^{2} (19.4 sq mi)
- Elevation: 530 m (1,740 ft)

Population (2025)
  - Total: 1,393
  - Density: 27.7/km^{2} (71.9/sq mi)
- Demonym: Isnellesi
- Time zone: UTC+1 (CET)
  - Summer (DST): UTC+2 (CEST)
- Postal code: 90010
- Dialing code: 0921
- Patron saint: St. Nicholas
- Saint day: September 7
- Website: Official website

Isnello (Sicilian: Isneḍḍu) is a comune (municipality) in the Metropolitan City of Palermo in the Italian region of Sicily, located about 70 kilometres (43 mi) southeast of Palermo.

Isnello borders the following municipalities: Castelbuono, Cefalù, Collesano, Gratteri, Petralia Sottana, Polizzi Generosa, Scillato.

Former New York City mayor Vincent R. Impellitteri was born in Isnello in 1900.

== Demographic evolution ==
Historical population

Year	Pop.	±%
1861	3,353	—
1871	3,678	+9.7%
1881	3,875	+5.4%
1901	4,390	+13.3%
1911	3,926	−10.6%

Year	Pop.	±%
1921	3,557	−9.4%
1931	3,679	+3.4%
1936	3,381	−8.1%
1951	3,697	+9.3%
1961	3,508	−5.1%

Year	Pop.	±%
1971	2,827	−19.4%
1981	2,502	−11.5%
1991	2,136	−14.6%
2001	1,923	−10.0%

Source: Data from ISTAT
