= Cerda =

- Comune
- Comune di Cerda
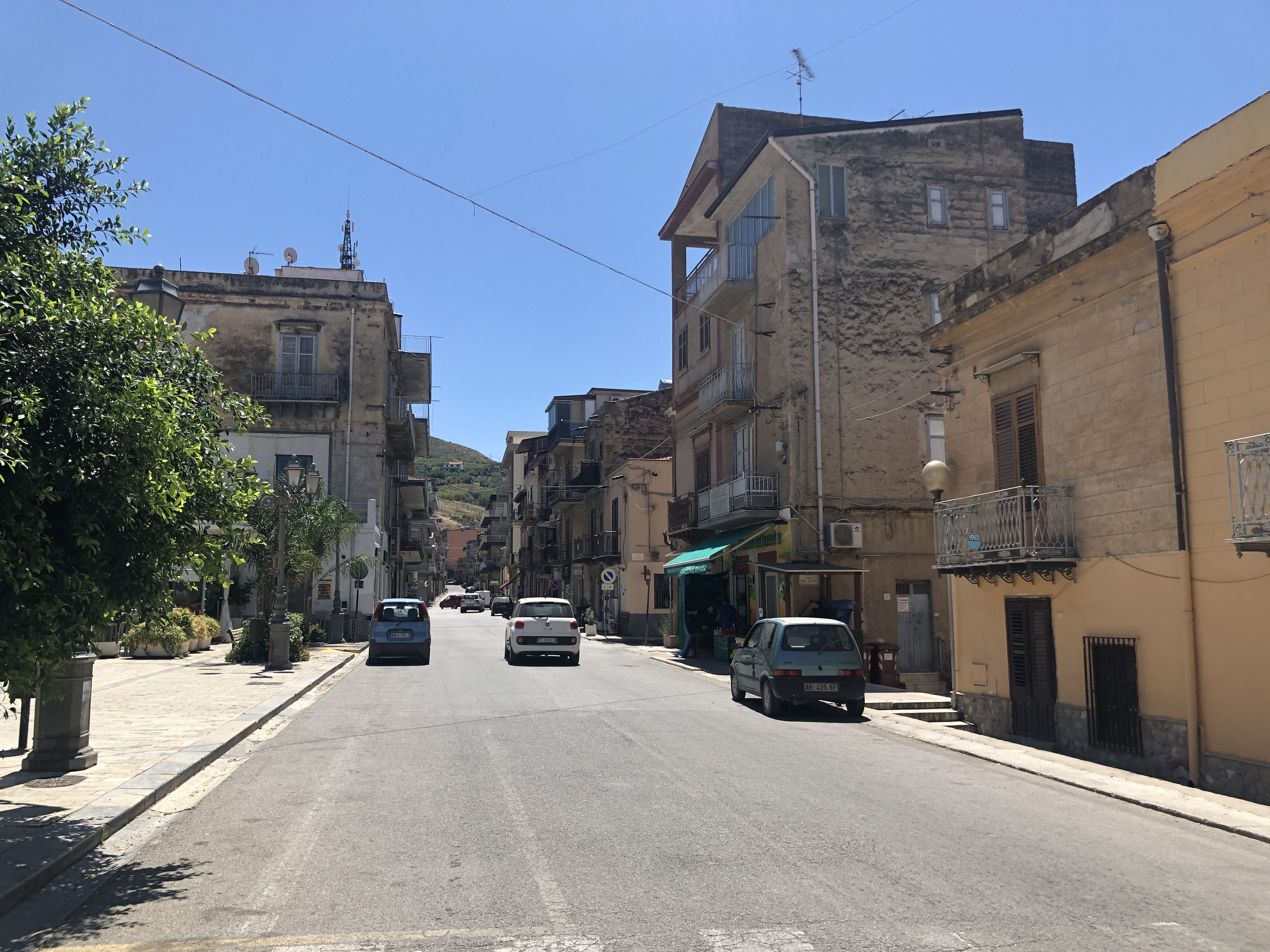

- Coat of arms

- Location within Italy Location within Sicily
- Coordinates: 37°54′N 13°49′E
- Country: Italy
- Region: Sicily
- Metropolitan city: Palermo (PA)
  - Mayor: (Andrea Mendola)

Area
  - Total: 43.8 km^{2} (16.9 sq mi)
- Elevation: 272 m (892 ft)

Population (31 December 2010)
  - Total: 5,369
  - Density: 123/km^{2} (317/sq mi)
- Demonym: Cerdesi
- Time zone: UTC+1 (CET)
  - Summer (DST): UTC+2 (CEST)
- Postal code: 90010
- Dialing code: 091
- Website: Official website

Cerda is a comune (municipality) in the Metropolitan City of Palermo in the Sicily region, Southern Italy, located about 45 kilometres (28 mi) southeast of Palermo.

Cerda borders the following municipalities: Aliminusa, Collesano, Sciara, Scillato, Sclafani Bagni, Termini Imerese and Montemaggiore Belsito.
