= Scillato =

- Comune
- Comune di Scillato
- Scillato in Palermo

- Location within Italy Location within Sicily
- Coordinates: 37°51′N 13°54′E
- Country: Italy
- Region: Sicily
- Metropolitan city: Palermo (PA)

Area
  - Total: 30.8 km^{2} (11.9 sq mi)

Population (Dec. 2004)
  - Total: 671
  - Density: 21.8/km^{2} (56.4/sq mi)
- Time zone: UTC+1 (CET)
  - Summer (DST): UTC+2 (CEST)
- Postal code: 90020
- Dialing code: 0921

Scillato (Sicilian: Sciḍḍatu) is a comune (municipality) in the Metropolitan City of Palermo in the Italian region Sicily, located about 60 kilometres (37 mi) southeast of Palermo. As of 31 December 2004, it had a population of 671 and an area of 30.8 square kilometres (11.9 mi^{2}).

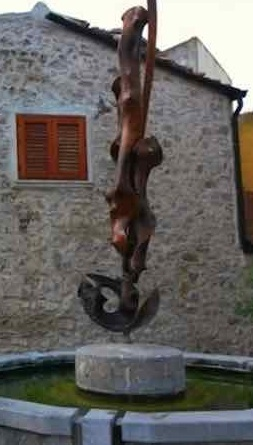
Scillato, Piazza Aldo Moro, sculpture by Vincenzo Gennaro

Scillato borders the following municipalities: Caltavuturo, Cerda, Collesano, Isnello, Polizzi Generosa, Sclafani Bagni.

== Demographic evolution ==
Historical population

Year	Pop.	±%
1861	510	—
1871	564	+10.6%
1881	689	+22.2%
1901	734	+6.5%
1911	741	+1.0%

Year	Pop.	±%
1921	713	−3.8%
1931	797	+11.8%
1936	1,030	+29.2%
1951	1,009	−2.0%
1961	1,022	+1.3%

Year	Pop.	±%
1971	857	−16.1%
1981	790	−7.8%
1991	806	+2.0%
2001	706	−12.4%

Source: Data from ISTAT
