= Antonio Ferrari =

Antonio Ferrari may refer to:

- Antonio Ferrari (composer) (c. 1592 – after 1629), Italian composer and organist
- Antonio de Ferraris (1444 – 1517), Italian scholar
- Antonio Ferrari, owner of the EuroInternational motor racing team
- Antonio Ferrari, actor in The Tree of Wooden Clogs
