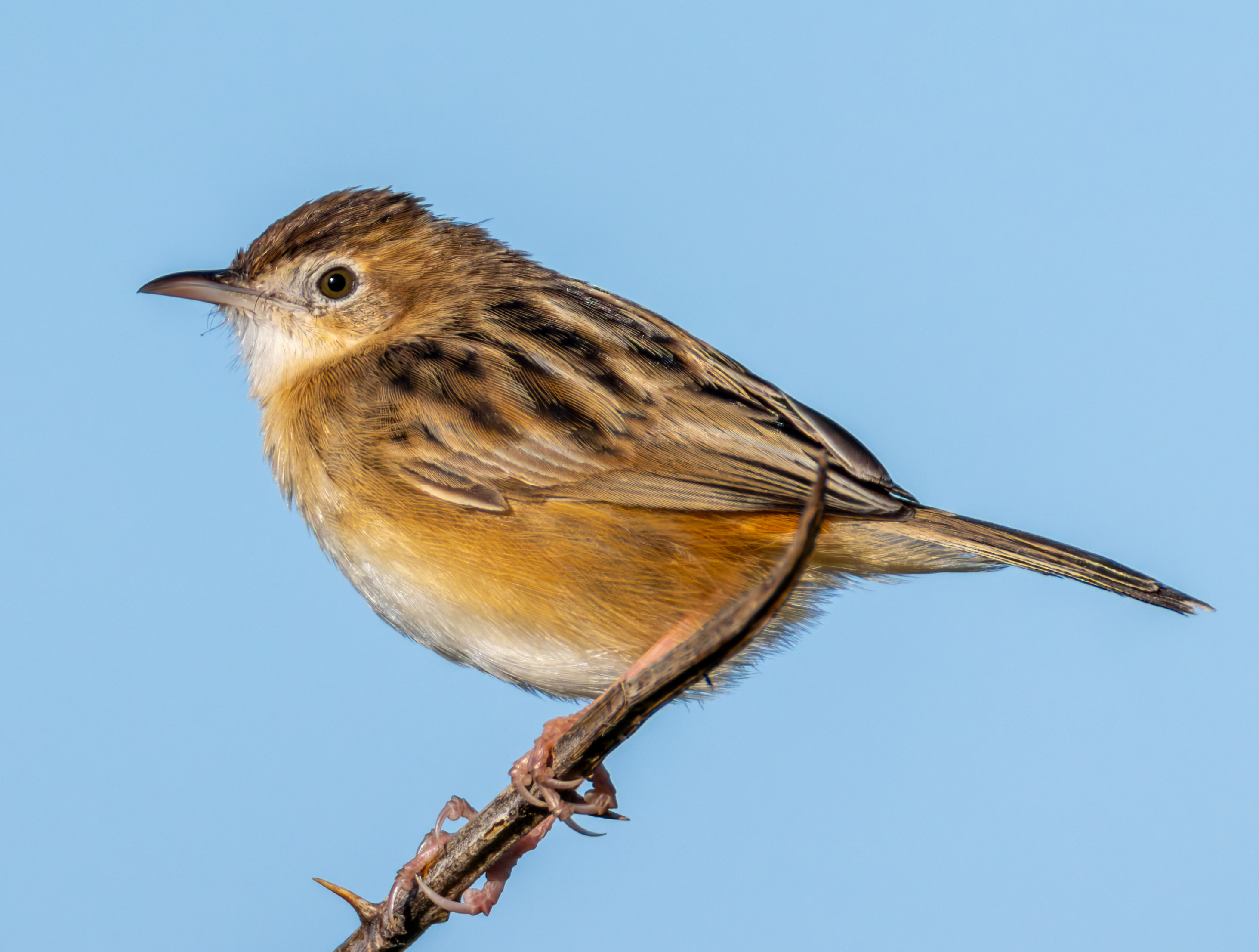
- C. j. cisticola (western group) in Île d'Aix, Charente-Maritime, France.

Conservation status
- Least Concern (IUCN 3.1)

Scientific classification
- Kingdom: Animalia
- Phylum: Chordata
- Class: Aves
- Order: Passeriformes
- Family: Cisticolidae
- Genus: Cisticola
- Species: C. juncidis

Binomial name
- Cisticola juncidis (Rafinesque, 1810)
- Range of C. juncidis Breeding Resident

Synonyms
- Sylvia juncidis Rafinesque, 1810

= Zitting cisticola =

Species of bird

The zitting cisticola, formerly also fan-tailed warbler or streaked fantail warbler (Cisticola juncidis), is a widely distributed Old World warbler in the family Cisticolidae, whose breeding range includes western and southern Europe, Africa outside the deserts and rainforest, and southern Asia down to northern Australia. A small bird found mainly in grasslands, it is best identified by its rufous rump; in addition it lacks any gold on the collar and the brownish tail is tipped with white. During the breeding season males have a zigzagging flight display accompanied by regular "zit" calls that give it its English name. They build their pouch nest suspended within a clump of grass.

== Taxonomy and systematics ==
The zitting cisticola was described by the naturalist Constantine Samuel Rafinesque in 1810 and given the binomial name Sylvia juncidis. The type locality is Campofelice di Roccella in Sicily. The current genus name Cisticola is from Ancient Greek kisthos, "rock-rose", and Latin colere, "to dwell". The specific juncidis is also from Latin and is a diminutive of iuncus, "reed".

=== Subspecies ===
A total of 17 subspecies are currently accepted; they fall into two main groups, with a deep genetic divide between them coinciding with the large gap in the range between western Iran and Pakistan:

- Western (Africa, Western Palearctic)
  - Cisticola juncidis cisticola (Temminck, 1820) — coastal western France to Iberian Peninsula, Balearic Islands, and northwestern Africa
  - Cisticola juncidis juncidis (Rafinesque, 1810) — southern France to Corsica, Sardinia, Balkans, Crete, Cyprus, Turkey, Syria, Israel, and Egypt
  - Cisticola juncidis uropygialis (L. Fraser, 1843) — Senegal to southern Nigeria, Sudan, Rwanda, and northern Tanzania; Mafia Island
  - Cisticola juncidis terrestris (A. Smith, 1842) — Equatorial Guinea (Río Muni), central Democratic Republic of the Congo, Burundi, and southern Tanzania southward to southern South Africa
  - Cisticola juncidis neuroticus Meinertzhagen, 1920 — Cyprus, Levant, Iraq, and western Iran
- Eastern (Eastern Palearctic to Australasia)
  - Cisticola juncidis cursitans (J. Franklin, 1831) — eastern Afghanistan to Pakistan, Nepal, northern Myanmar, India, and dry lowlands of northeastern Sri Lanka
  - Cisticola juncidis salimalii H. Whistler, 1936 — southwestern India (Kerala)
  - Cisticola juncidis omalurus E. Blyth, 1851 — moist areas of Sri Lanka
  - Cisticola juncidis brunniceps (C. J. Temminck & H. Schlegel, 1850) — Korea, Japan (Honshu southward, including Ryukyu & Izu islands), and Batan Islands north of the Philippines
  - Cisticola juncidis tinnabulans (R. Swinhoe, 1859) — southern China to Indochina, Hainan, Taiwan, and Philippines
  - Cisticola juncidis nigrostriatus K. C. Parkes, 1971 — southwestern Philippines (Culion and Palawan)
  - Cisticola juncidis malaya H. Lynes, 1930 — Nicobar Islands, southern Myanmar, and Thailand through the Thai-Malay Peninsula to Sumatra and Java
  - Cisticola juncidis fuscicapilla Wallace, 1864 — eastern Java, Kangean Islands, and Lesser Sundas
  - Cisticola juncidis constans H. Lynes, 1938 — Sulawesi region, including Togian and Peleng, and Banggai, Muna, and Tukangbesi islands off east & southeast Sulawesi
  - Cisticola juncidis leanyeri T. V. Givens & W. B. Hitchcock, WB, 1953 — north-central Australia (Tiwi Islands, northeastern Northern Territory, and southwestern Gulf of Carpentaria)
  - Cisticola juncidis normani G. M. Mathews, 1914 — coastal southern New Guinea and coastal northeastern Australia (southeastern Gulf of Carpentaria to Princess Charlotte Bay)
  - Cisticola juncidis laveryi R. Schodde & I. J. Mason, 1979 — northeastern Australia (Ingham to Rockhampton, northeastern Queensland)

The subspecies differ slightly in plumage and size, and more obviously in song structure; some have been suggested as potential full species.

In a major study of the song, two major regional song types were found, with one group of seven dialects in Africa and the Western Palearctic, and the other with eight dialects in the Eastern Palearctic to Australasia. Within each of the two regions, the dialects overlap, and did not fully match the accepted subspecies boundaries, suggesting more local and moderate distance dispersal than previously believed (e.g. a bird with a typically northwestern African dialect found in Corsica, and one with a typically mid-European dialect found in western Morocco). In much of the range, the song is given evenly spaced "zit – zit – zit – zit – zit – zit", but in eastern Asia, a 'double zit' form "zit zit – zit zit – zit zit" occurs, largely (but not fully) coinciding with the subspecies C. j. malaya, C. j. tinnabulans, C. j. brunniceps, and the Indonesian and Australasian subspecies. The Indian subspecies C. j. cursitans has singly-spaced "zit" as in the western birds, but with the 'zit dialect' more like other eastern birds.

C. j. salimalii does not show seasonal tail length variation as in C. j. cursitans, which has a longer tail in the non-breeding season.

This species was previously known as the fan-tailed warbler, but the current name gives consistency with the many tropical cisticola species, as well as avoiding confusion with an American species also named the fan-tailed warbler.

Western group C. j. terrestris
Kwa-Zulu Natal, South Africa

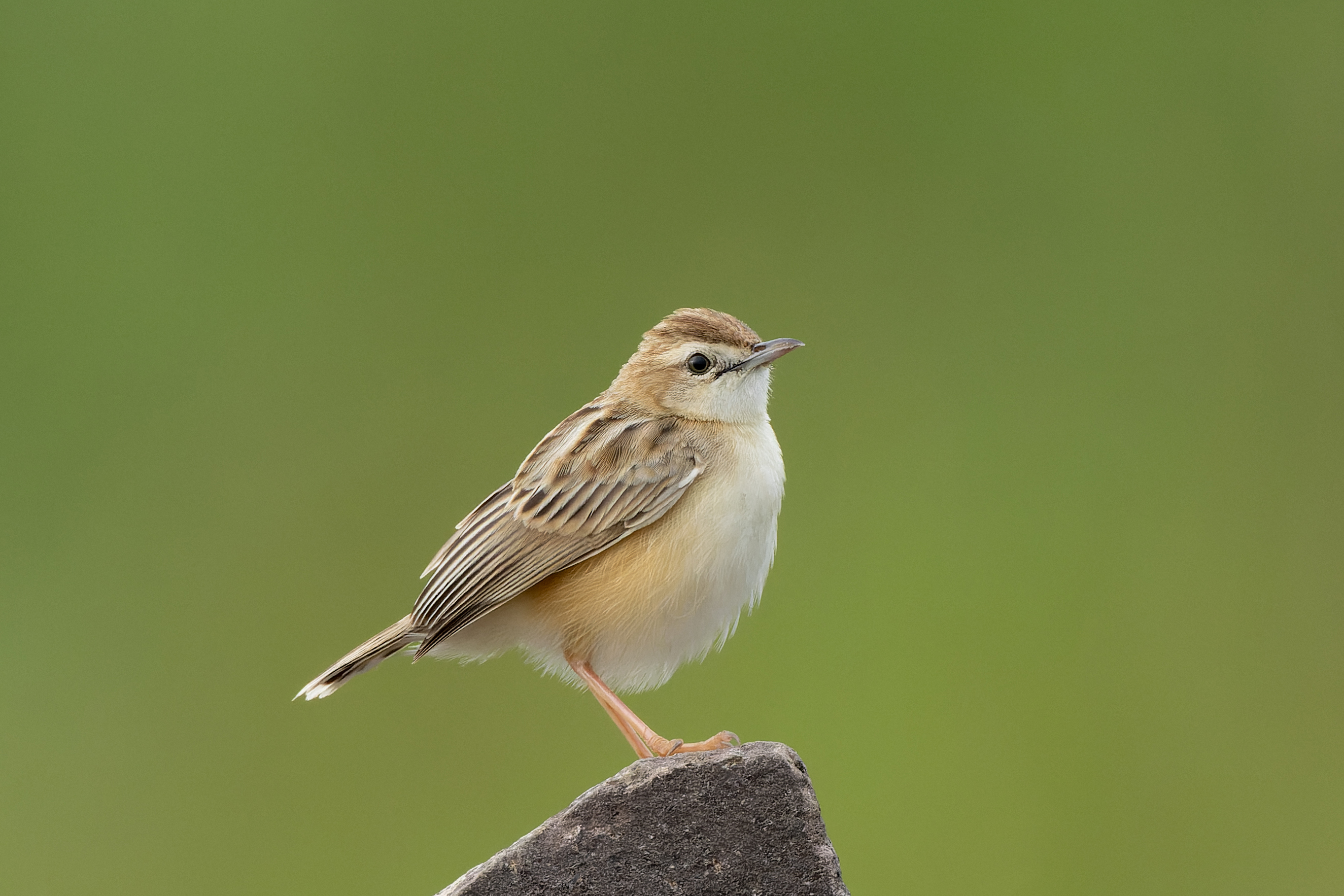
Eastern group C. j. cursitans
Bhigwan, Maharashtra, India

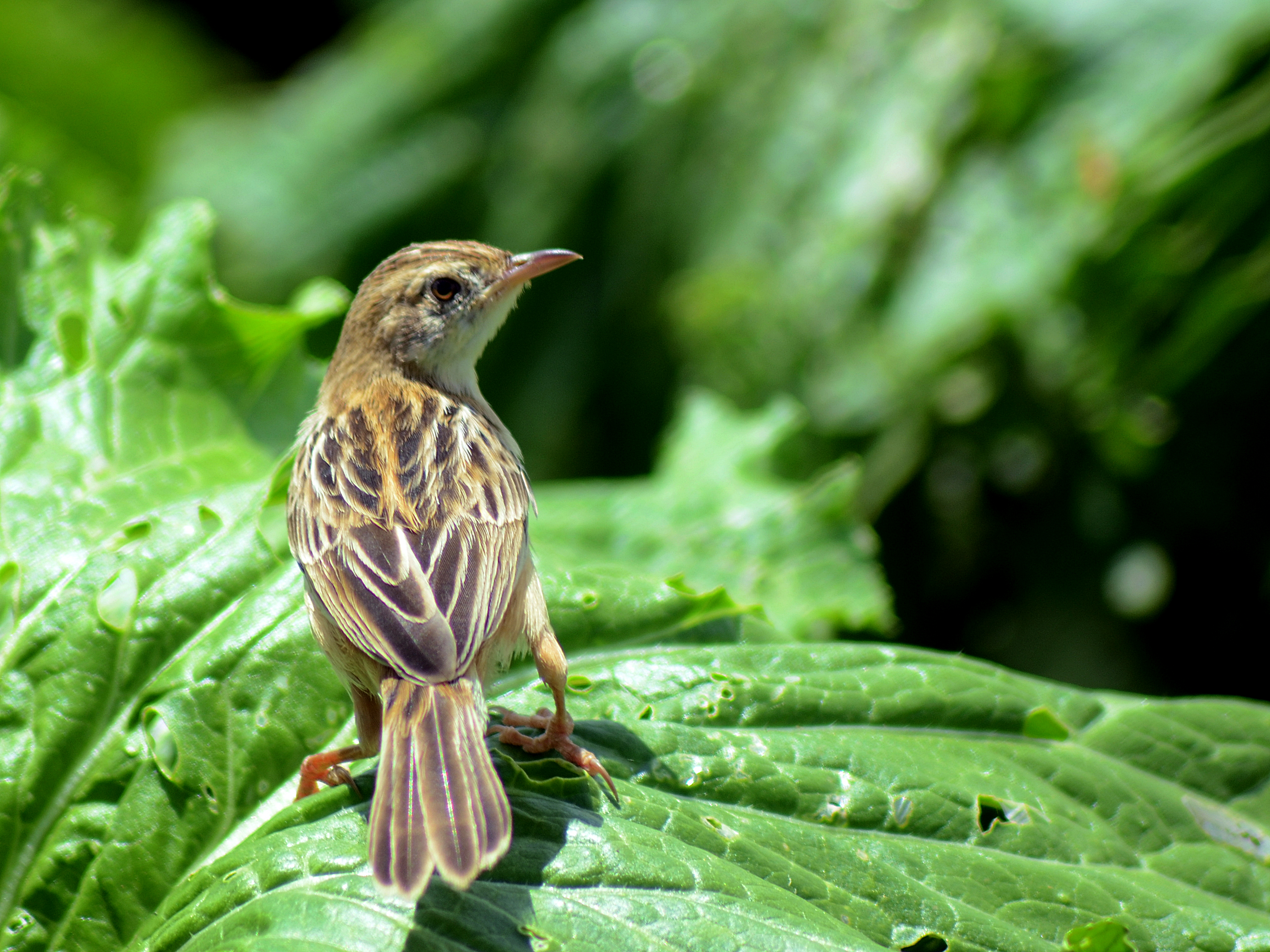
C. j. constans
Tomohon, Sulawesi

== Description ==
The zitting cisticola is 10 to 12 cm (3.9 to 4.7 in) in length. It is brown above, heavily streaked with black markings. The underparts are whitish, and the tail is broad, white-tipped and flicked frequently, giving rise to the alternative name for the species. The adult males have less crown streaking and more back marking than the females, but there are no great differences between the sexes or the 17 geographical subspecies. The absence of a nuchal collar separates it from the golden-headed cisticola (Cisticola exilis). In the non-breeding season, they tend to skulk within the grass and can be hard to spot.

== Habitat and distribution ==
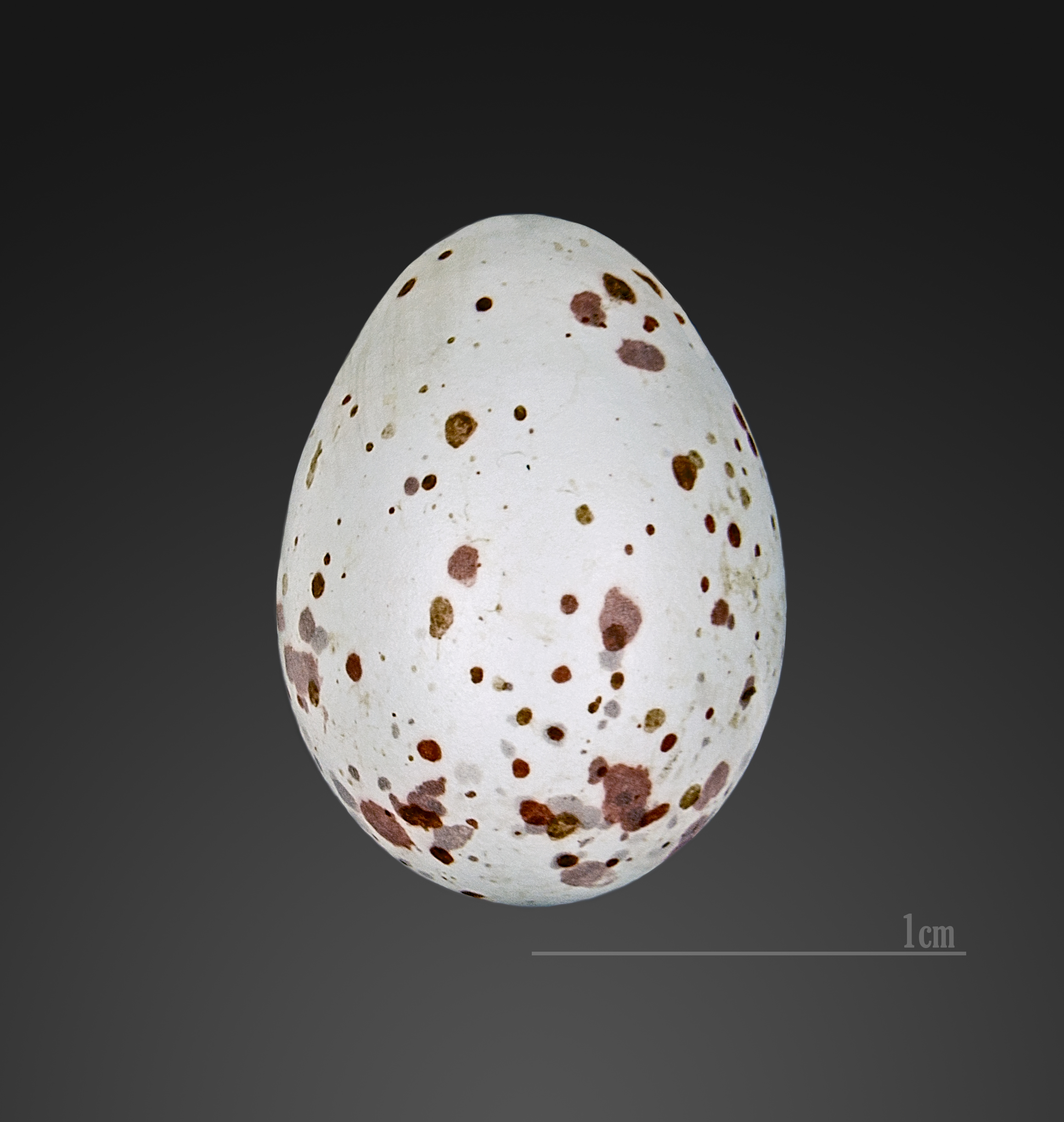
Egg of C. j. cisticola, Algeria; collection MHNT

This species is found mainly in grassland habitats, often near water. Most populations are resident, but some East Asian populations migrate south to warmer areas in winter. In the Himalayas, they ascend to about 1,900 m (6,200 ft) during summer but are below 1,300 m (4,300 ft) in the winter. This species is a rare vagrant to northern Europe, mostly as a spring overshoot. Its European range is generally expanding, although northern populations are especially susceptible to hard winters. In 2025 the species bred in Britain for the first time.

== Behaviour and ecology ==
Zitting cisticolas are very small insectivorous birds, sometimes found in small groups. The breeding season is associated with the rains. Two broods a year occur in many regions. Males are generally polygynous, but some are monogamous. The male builds the initial nest structure deep in the grasses, and invites females using a special display. Females that accept the male complete the nest. The nest is made by binding living leaves into the soft fabric of felted plant-down, cobwebs, and grass. The zitting cisticola's nest is a cup shape with a canopy of tied-together leaves or grasses overhead for camouflage; 3–6 eggs are laid. The female incubates the eggs, which hatch after about 10 days. More than one brood may be raised. Females change their mates frequently and rarely stay within the same territory, while males are less mobile, maintaining non-overlapping song-territories which shift from day to day. Females can sometimes breed in their first year.
