= Sclafani Bagni =

- Comune
- Comune di Sclafani Bagni
- Sclafani Bagni within the Metropolitan City of Palermo

- Location within Italy Location within Sicily
- Coordinates: 37°49′N 13°51′E
- Country: Italy
- Region: Sicily
- Metropolitan city: Palermo (PA)

Government
  - Mayor: Giuseppe Leone

Area
  - Total: 136.8 km^{2} (52.8 sq mi)
- Elevation: 813 m (2,667 ft)

Population (30 November 2016)
  - Total: 431
  - Density: 3.15/km^{2} (8.16/sq mi)
- Demonym: Sclafanesi
- Time zone: UTC+1 (CET)
  - Summer (DST): UTC+2 (CEST)
- Postal code: 90020
- Dialing code: 0921
- Website: Official website

Sclafani Bagni (Sicilian: Sclàfani Bagni) is a comune (municipality) in the Metropolitan City of Palermo in the Italian region Sicily, located about 50 kilometres (31 mi) southeast of Palermo.

== Geography ==
Sclafani Bagni borders the following municipalities: Alia, Aliminusa, Caccamo, Caltavuturo, Castronovo di Sicilia, Cerda, Montemaggiore Belsito, Polizzi Generosa, Scillato, Valledolmo, Vallelunga Pratameno.

== Main sights ==
- Mother Church of Santa Maria Assunta. Of medieval origins, it was renewed in the 14th and 17th century. It houses paintings from the 16th and 17th centuries.
- Churches of St. Philip and St. James, both first mentioned in 1573.
- Remains of the medieval castle.
