= Lascari =

- Comune
- Comune di Lascari
- Location within Italy Location within Sicily
- Coordinates: 38°0′N 13°56′E
- Country: Italy
- Region: Sicily
- Metropolitan city: Palermo (PA)

Area
  - Total: 10.4 km^{2} (4.0 sq mi)

Population (April 2019)
  - Total: 3,635
  - Density: 350/km^{2} (905/sq mi)
- Demonym: Lascaresi
- Time zone: UTC+1 (CET)
  - Summer (DST): UTC+2 (CEST)
- Postal code: 90010
- Dialing code: 0921
- Website: Official website

Lascari (Sicilian: Làschiri) is a comune (municipality) in the Metropolitan City of Palermo in the Italian region Sicily, located about 50 kilometres (31 mi) east of Palermo. As of 30 November 2016, it had a population of 3,602 and an area of 10.4 square kilometres (4.0 mi^{2}).

Lascari borders the following municipalities: Campofelice di Roccella, Cefalù, Collesano, Gratteri.

== History ==
In 1693, a group of peasants moved from Gratteri in the mountains, to a zone near the sea. They began to build houses around an existing bell tower. Baron Gaetano Ventimiglia gave the new hamlet the name of Lascari, in honor of his descent from the strain of Lascari's emperors of Constantinople. In 1840 Lascari became independent from Gratteri and in 1890 the right to a territory was granted but only in 1924 the town obtained it. Today the territory is about 10.4 square kilometres (4.0 mi^{2}) with a population of 3,500. Lascari is located 50 kilometres (31 mi) east of Palermo, the capital city of Sicily. During these last years a lot of detached or semi-detached houses have been built near the beaches, so in the summer a lot of holiday-makers come here from Palermo or other towns in the centre of Sicily. The town hall is in "Aldo Moro" square.

== Demographic evolution ==
Historical population

Year	Pop.	±%
1861	957	—
1871	1,175	+22.8%
1881	1,364	+16.1%
1901	1,700	+24.6%
1911	1,720	+1.2%

Year	Pop.	±%
1921	1,861	+8.2%
1931	2,009	+8.0%
1936	2,172	+8.1%
1951	2,358	+8.6%
1961	2,467	+4.6%

Year	Pop.	±%
1971	2,418	−2.0%
1981	2,660	+10.0%
1991	3,030	+13.9%
2001	3,132	+3.4%

Source: Data from ISTAT
