= Aliminusa =

Aliminusa Larminusa (Sicilian)
- Comune
- Comune di Aliminusa
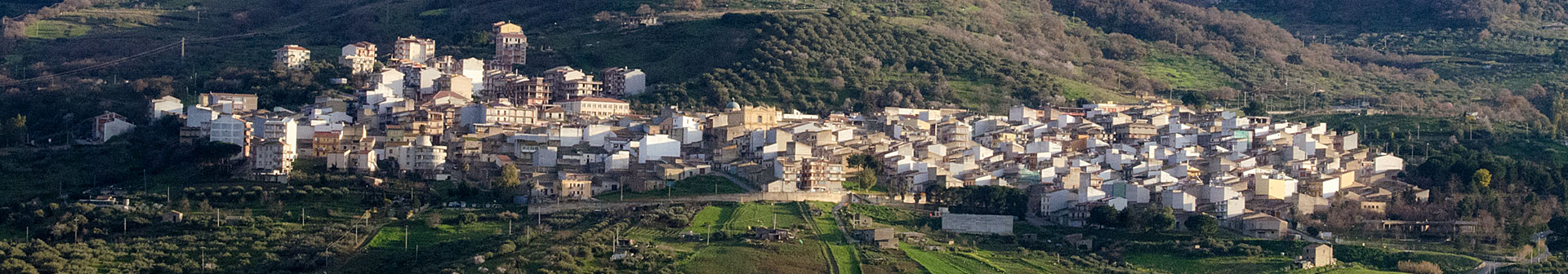
- Aliminusa

- Coat of arms

- Location of Aliminusa in Italy Aliminusa (Sicily)
- Coordinates: 37°52′N 13°47′E
- Country: Italy
- Region: Sicily
- Metropolitan city: Palermo (PA)

Government
  - Mayor: Michele Panzarella

Area
  - Total: 13 km^{2} (5.0 sq mi)
- Elevation: 450 m (1,480 ft)

Population (30 November 2016)
  - Total: 1,215
  - Density: 93/km^{2} (240/sq mi)
- Demonym: Aliminusani
- Time zone: UTC+1 (CET)
  - Summer (DST): UTC+2 (CEST)
- Postal code: 90020
- Dialing code: 091
- Website: Official website

Aliminusa (Italian: [alimiˈnuːza]; Sicilian: Larminusa) is a comune (municipality) in the Metropolitan City of Palermo in the Sicily region of Southern Italy, located about 45 kilometres (28 mi) southeast of Palermo.

Aliminusa borders the following municipalities: Caccamo, Cerda, Montemaggiore Belsito, Sciara, Sclafani Bagni.
