= Vincenzo Sellaro =

Vincenzo Sellaro (April 24, 1868 – November 28, 1932) was the founder of the Order of the Sons of Italy in America (OSIA), the largest Italian American Organization in the United States. Sellaro founded the "Figli d'Italia in America" to help Italian Americans work with one another to better their social, civic, and personal standing in society.

Sellaro was born in Polizzi Generosa in the Province of Palermo in Italy. He earned a medical degree from the University of Naples Federico II in 1895 and immigrated to the United States in 1897. After arriving in New York City he cared primarily for Italian immigrants, many of them who spoke little or no English. He set up a group of bilingual medical doctors to care for the Italian immigrants and in 1902 oversaw the opening of the Columbus Italian Hospital in New York, where Italian was spoken.

Sellaro died at the age of 64 on November 28, 1932 and is buried in Woodlawn Cemetery in the Bronx, New York, where his grave is maintained with a small Italian flag that is placed next to his headstone.
