= Campofelice di Roccella =

- Comune
- Comune di Campofelice di Roccella
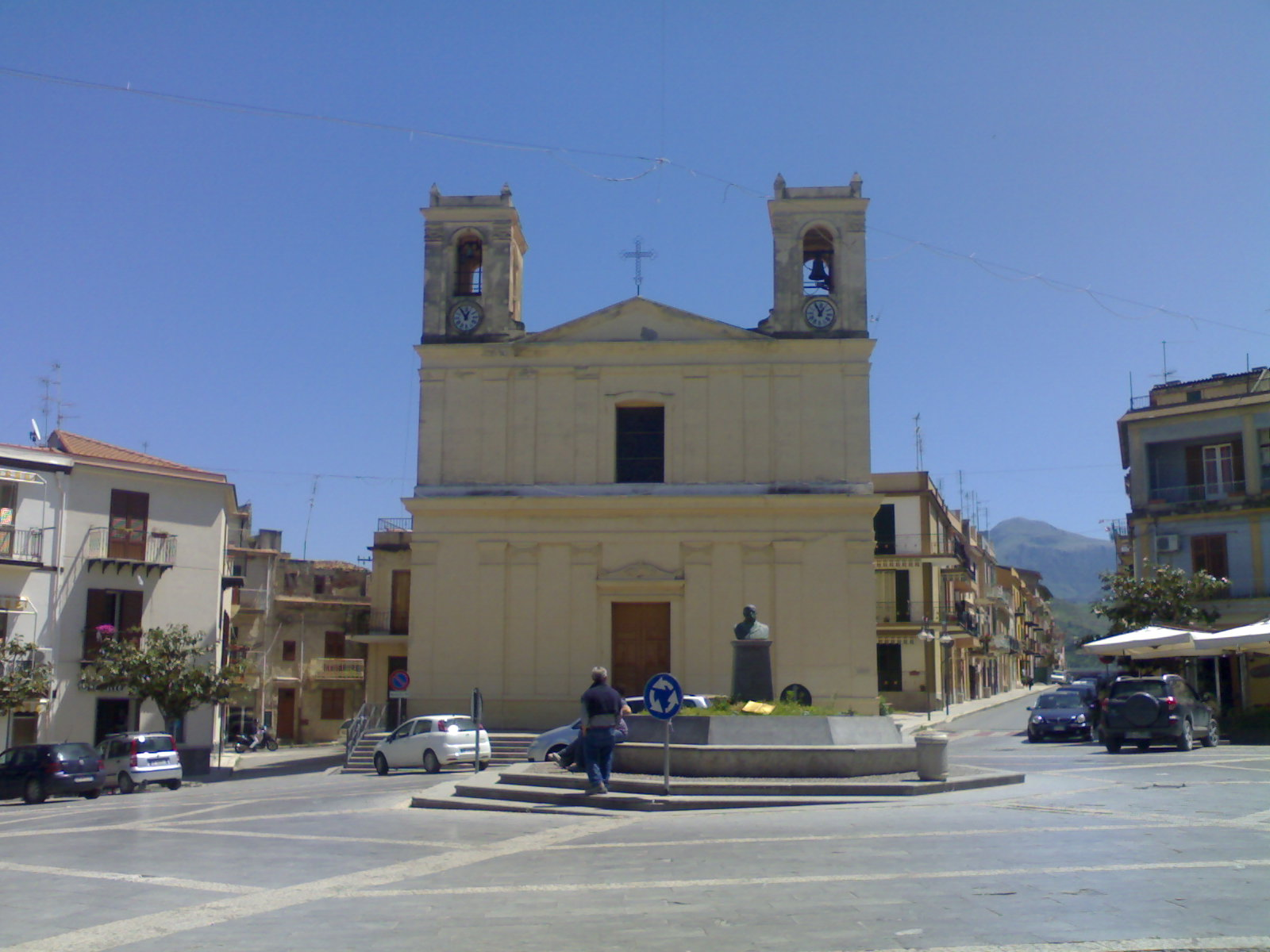

- Location within Italy Location within Sicily
- Coordinates: 37°59′N 13°53′E
- Country: Italy
- Region: Sicily
- Metropolitan city: Palermo (PA)

Area
  - Total: 14.7 km^{2} (5.7 sq mi)
- Elevation: 54 m (177 ft)

Population (Dec. 2004)
  - Total: 5,896
  - Density: 401/km^{2} (1,040/sq mi)
- Demonym: Campofelicesi
- Time zone: UTC+1 (CET)
  - Summer (DST): UTC+2 (CEST)
- Postal code: 90010
- Dialing code: 0921
- Website: Official website

Campofelice di Roccella (Sicilian: Campufilici di Ruccedda) is a comune (municipality) in the Metropolitan City of Palermo in the Italian region of Sicily, located about 50 kilometres (31 mi) southeast of Palermo. As of 31 December 2004, it had a population of 5,896 and an area of 14.7 square kilometres (5.7 mi^{2}).

Campofelice di Roccella borders the following municipalities: Collesano, Lascari, Termini Imerese.

== Demographic evolution ==
Historical population

Year	Pop.	±%
1861	1,261	—
1871	1,447	+14.8%
1881	1,827	+26.3%
1901	2,546	+39.4%
1911	2,692	+5.7%

Year	Pop.	±%
1921	2,540	−5.6%
1931	2,705	+6.5%
1936	2,874	+6.2%
1951	3,726	+29.6%
1961	3,779	+1.4%

Year	Pop.	±%
1971	4,112	+8.8%
1981	5,015	+22.0%
1991	5,328	+6.2%
2001	5,748	+7.9%

Source: Data from ISTAT
