= Gratteri =

- Comune
- Comune di Gratteri
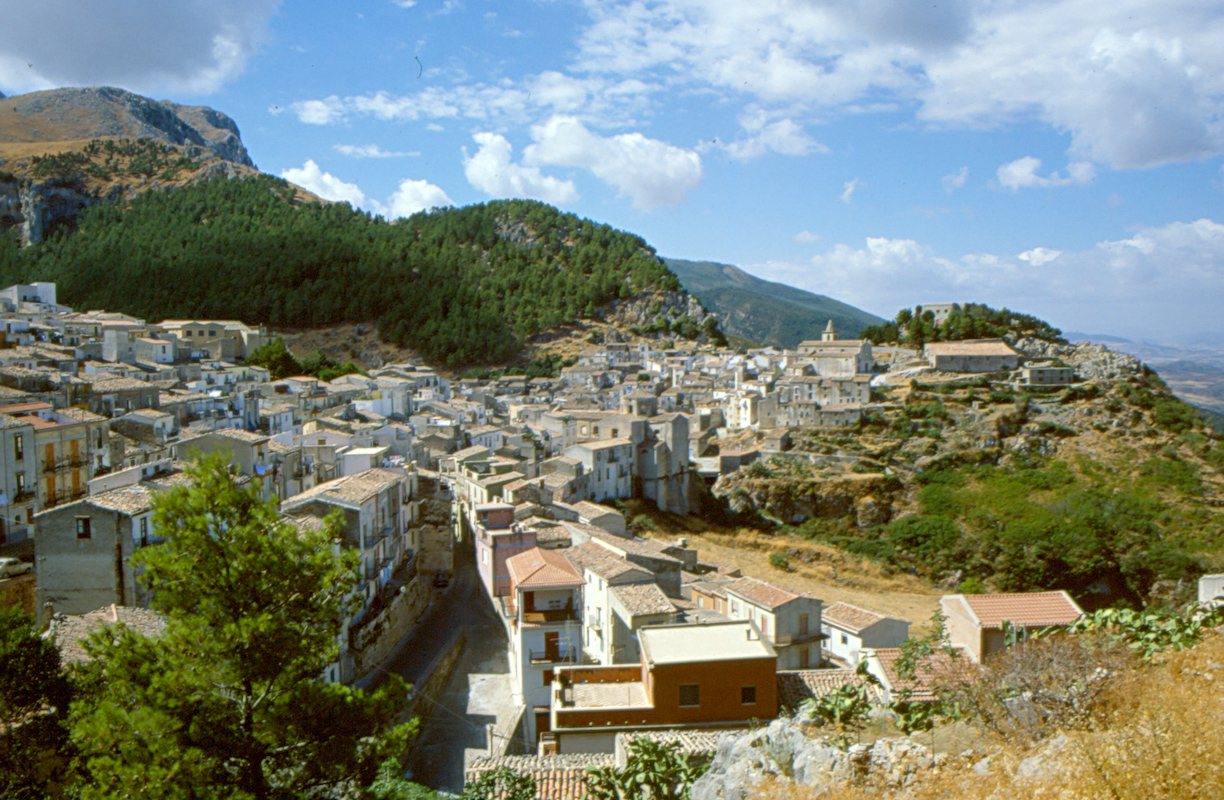
- Panorama of Gratteri

- Location within Italy Location within Sicily
- Coordinates: 37°58′N 13°58′E
- Country: Italy
- Region: Sicily
- Metropolitan city: Palermo (PA)

Area
  - Total: 38.4 km^{2} (14.8 sq mi)

Population (Dec. 2004)
  - Total: 1,050
  - Density: 27.3/km^{2} (70.8/sq mi)
- Time zone: UTC+1 (CET)
  - Summer (DST): UTC+2 (CEST)
- Postal code: 90010
- Dialing code: 0921
- Website: Official website

Gratteri (Sicilian: Ratteri) is a comune (municipality) in the Metropolitan City of Palermo, in the Italian region of Sicily, located about 60 kilometres (37 mi) southeast of Palermo. As of 31 December 2004, it had a population of 1,050 and an area of 38.4 square kilometres (14.8 mi^{2}).

Gratteri borders the following comuni: Cefalù, Collesano, Isnello, Lascari.

== Demographic evolution ==
Historical population

Year	Pop.	±%
1861	2,764	—
1871	2,871	+3.9%
1881	3,076	+7.1%
1901	3,230	+5.0%
1911	3,291	+1.9%

Year	Pop.	±%
1921	2,974	−9.6%
1931	2,762	−7.1%
1936	2,656	−3.8%
1951	2,353	−11.4%
1961	2,114	−10.2%

Year	Pop.	±%
1971	1,705	−19.3%
1981	1,351	−20.8%
1991	1,226	−9.3%
2001	1,079	−12.0%

Source: Data from ISTAT
