= Sciara, Sicily =

Sciara Xara
- Comune
- Comune di Sciara
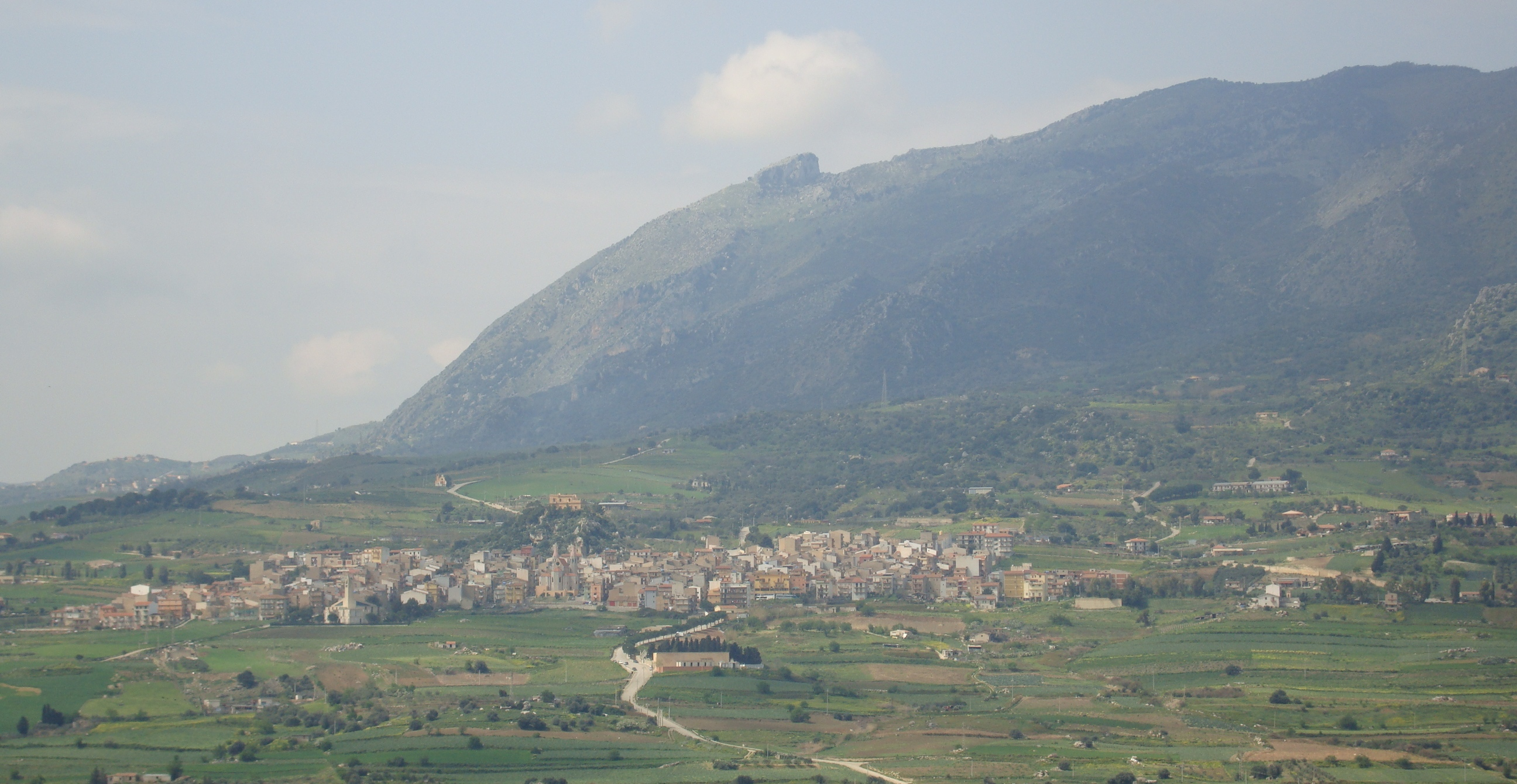

- Location within Italy Location within Sicily
- Coordinates: 37°55′N 13°46′E
- Country: Italy
- Region: Sicily
- Metropolitan city: Palermo (PA)

Area
  - Total: 31.2 km^{2} (12.0 sq mi)

Population (Dec. 2004)
  - Total: 2,788
  - Density: 89.4/km^{2} (231/sq mi)
- Time zone: UTC+1 (CET)
  - Summer (DST): UTC+2 (CEST)
- Postal code: 90020
- Dialing code: 091

Sciara (Xara in Sicilian; Sicilian pronunciation: [ˈʃara]) is a comune (municipality) near the Metropolitan City of Palermo in the Italian region Sicily, located about 40 kilometres (25 mi) southeast of Palermo. As of 31 December 2004, it had a population of 2,788 and an area of 31.2 square kilometres (12.0 mi^{2}).

Sciara borders the following municipalities: Aliminusa, Caccamo, Cerda, Termini Imerese.

Sciara is a small farming town. The main crops are tomatoes, artichokes and olives. Many houses are empty because of emigration to the north of Italy, Germany and the United States during the 1970s, 1980s, etc., due to poor economic conditions. Many emigrants still own their land and houses in Sciara and are proud of their town.

== History ==
Sciara was founded in 1671 by Prince Filippo Notarbartolo, under formal authorization by royal decree of Charles II of Spain issued on 13 November 1671. Sciara was one of the over 30 fiefdoms owned by the House of Notarbartolo.

In 1860 the feudal system collapsed: peasants from Sciara chased away the gabellotti, occupied the land and distributed it among themselves.

== Demographic evolution ==
Historical population

Year	Pop.	±%
1861	1,537	—
1871	1,763	+14.7%
1881	2,094	+18.8%
1901	2,220	+6.0%
1911	2,255	+1.6%

Year	Pop.	±%
1921	2,214	−1.8%
1931	2,090	−5.6%
1936	2,449	+17.2%
1951	2,801	+14.4%
1961	3,029	+8.1%

Year	Pop.	±%
1971	2,612	−13.8%
1981	2,668	+2.1%
1991	2,730	+2.3%
2001	2,718	−0.4%
2021	2,535	−6.7%

Source: Data from ISTAT
