= Antonio Ferraro =

Antonio Ferraro, sometimes given as Antonio Ferrari (born Giuseppe Ferraro, c. 1592 – after 1629), was an Italian composer, organist, and Carmelite friar.

== Biography ==
Antonio Ferraro was born in Polizzi Generosa, Sicily. Some sources make the general claim that he was born sometime in the second half of the sixteenth century, others state that he was born in c. 1592. It is likely that he was educated as a musician in Palermo either prior to or while serving as a Carmelite friar. By 1613, he was residing at the monastery in Termini Imerese. There, he was a student of Michele Malerba in c. 1614, and he adopted the religious name of Antonio, giving up his birth name of Giuseppe.

Ferraro dedicated himself to composing sacred music; particularly motets and settings of psalms. At the time of his first publication, Sacrae cantiones … liber primus (1617, Rome) he was serving as organist of a monastery at Catania. This publication contains 32 concertato motets, for one to four voices, all with continuo. He later authored a book of motets Ghirlanda di sacri fiori: secondo libro degli ecclesiastici conserti (1623, Palermo).

Ferraro died sometime after 1629.
