= Montemaggiore Belsito =

- Comune
- Comune di Montemaggiore Belsito
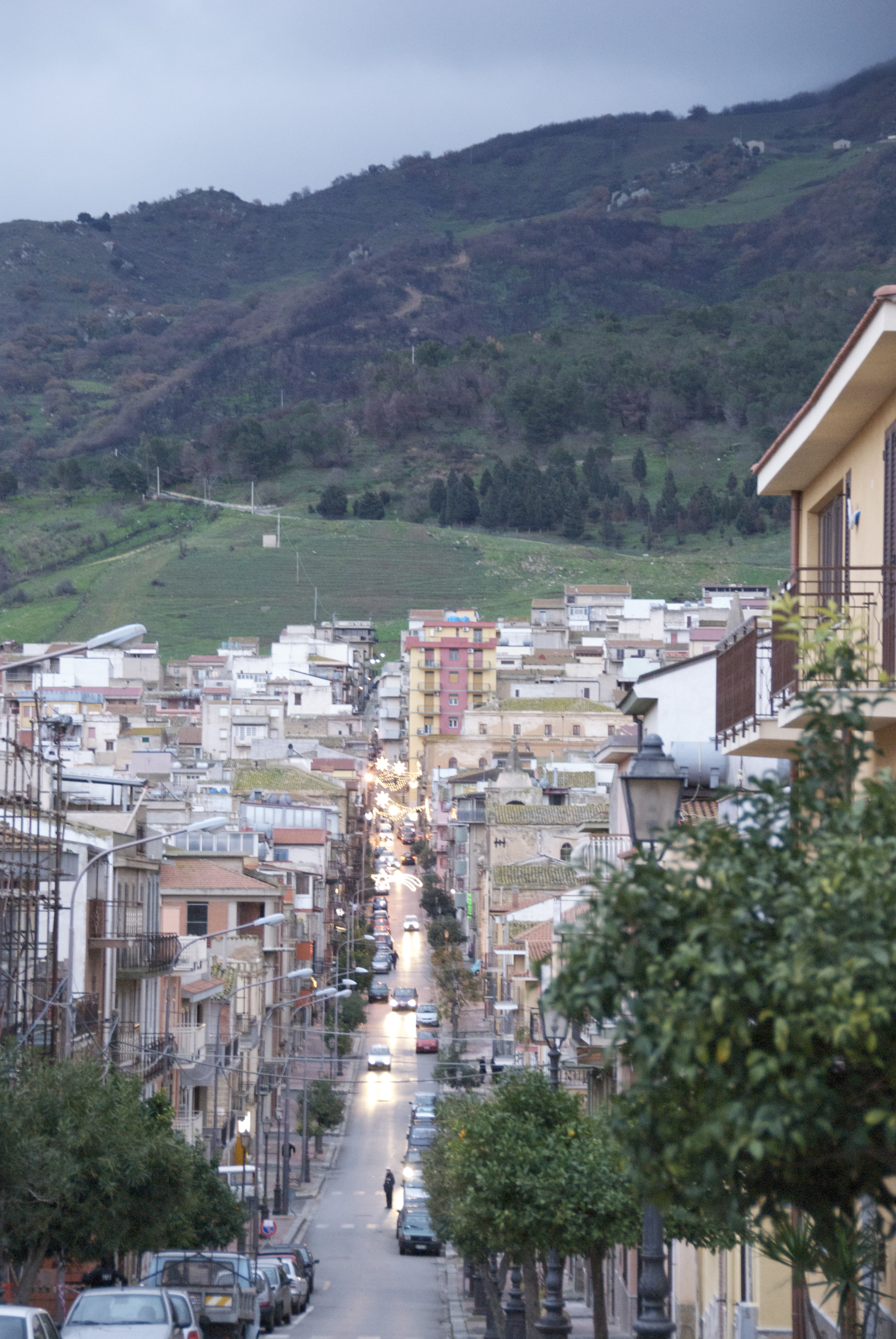

- Coat of arms

- Location within Italy Location within Sicily
- Coordinates: 37°51′N 13°46′E
- Country: Italy
- Region: Sicily
- Metropolitan city: Palermo (PA)

Government
  - Mayor: Cosimo Gullo

Area
  - Total: 31 km^{2} (12 sq mi)
- Elevation: 517 m (1,696 ft)

Population (30 November 2016)
  - Total: 3,324
  - Density: 110/km^{2} (280/sq mi)
- Demonym: Montemaggioresi
- Time zone: UTC+1 (CET)
  - Summer (DST): UTC+2 (CEST)
- Postal code: 90020
- Dialing code: 091
- Patron saint: Jesus on the Cross
- Saint day: 14 September
- Website: Official website

Montemaggiore Belsito (Sicilian: Muntimajuri) is a small town and comune in the Metropolitan City of Palermo, Sicily, Southern Italy. It is located about 50 kilometres (31 mi) southeast of Palermo, near the comunes of Cerda and Termini Imerese.

Slightly damaged by several earthquakes, there are several churches and a palace. It is about 517 metres (1,696 ft) above sea level. The village is crossed by a main road that links many others villages (Alia, Aliminusa, Cerda) to highways A19 and A20. A northern portion of the road is still used for the Targa Florio, one of the oldest car races, as well as now a rally course.
