= Order Sons of Italy in America =

Italian American fraternal organization

Order Sons and Daughters of Italy in America
- L’Ordine Figli d’Italia in America
- Abbreviation: OSDIA
- Formation: June 22, 1905; 120 years ago
- Founder: Vincenzo Sellaro
- Headquarters: Washington, D.C.
- Website: osdia.org

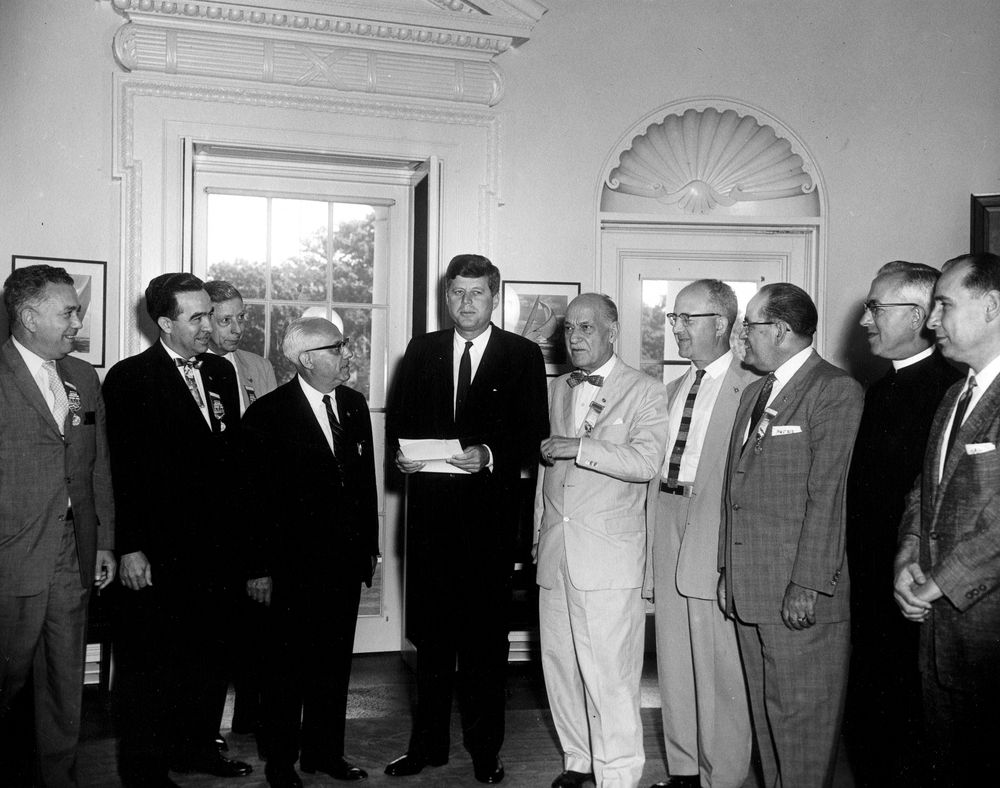
President John F. Kennedy meets with Members of Order of Sons of Italy in America (1961)

The Order Sons and Daughters of Italy in America (Washington D.C.), formerly the Order Sons of Italy in America (Italian: Ordine Figli d’Italia in America, OSIA), is the largest and the oldest Italian American fraternal organization in the United States. A similar organization exists in Canada.

It has more than 600,000 members and supporters. Since its founding in 1905 it has established more than 2,800 lodges in 43 states, with the headquarters located near Capitol Hill in Washington, D.C.

== History ==
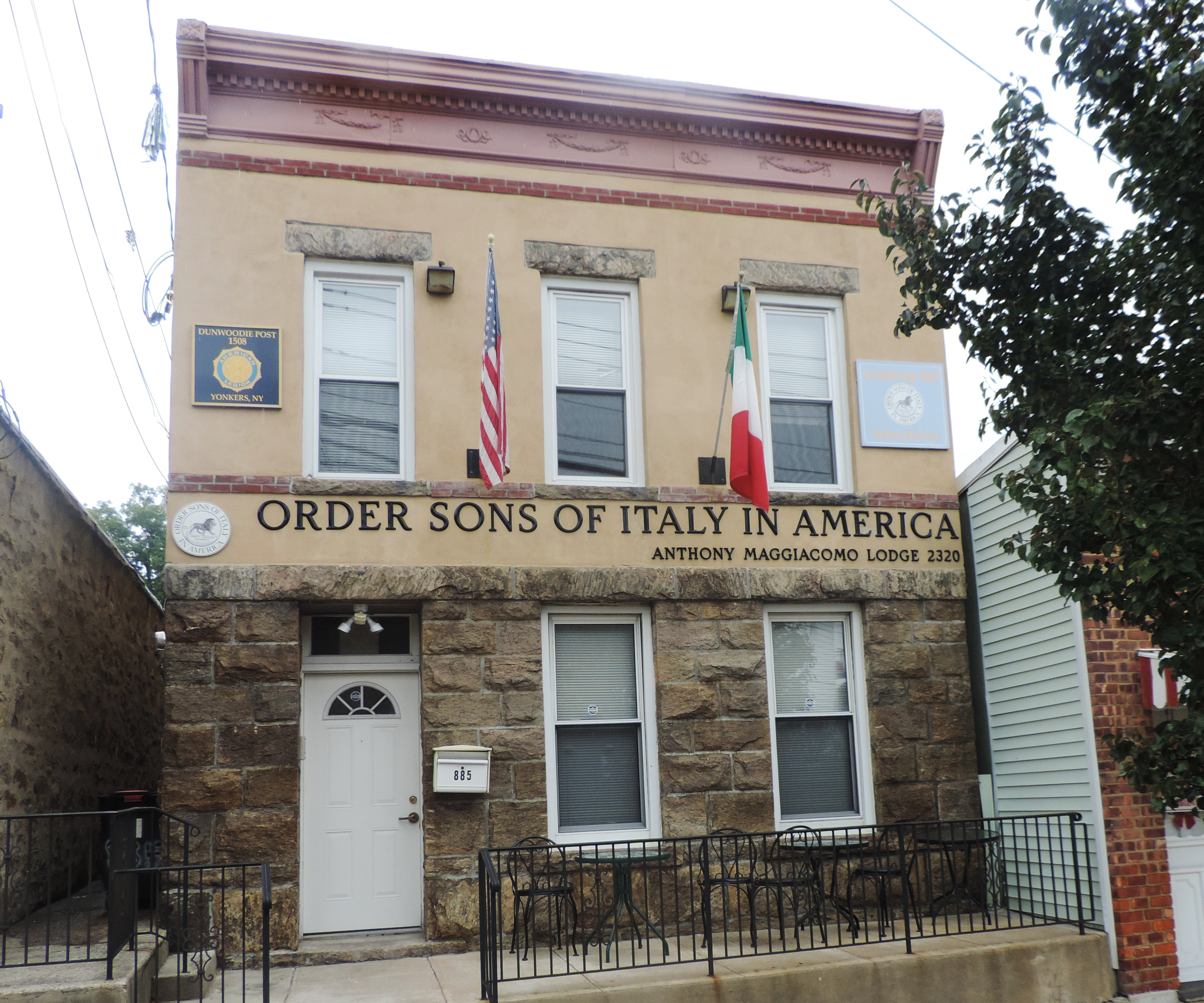
Lodge in Yonkers, New York

It was founded on June 22, 1905, by Vincenzo Sellaro to help assimilate Italians into American society during the immigration boom of the early 20th century. In recognition of his social and medical achievements, Governor Alfred Emanuel Smith gifted Sellaro the key to the City of New York in 1928.

OSIA was a supporter of the labor movement. In 1927, OSIA sent an attorney to Massachusetts to assist the appeal of the conviction of Sacco and Vanzetti, which OSIA described as a "terrible miscarriage of justice". OSIA's support for Sacco and Vanzetti was urged by prominent Italian-Americans, including fascists, who had formed the Comitato Pro Sacco-Vanzetti.

In November 1925, OSIA helped organize the first U.S. Fascist convention in Philadelphia. The goal of the convention was "setting up Fascist infiltration into political organizations and mutual aid societies so as to create friendly ties and spiritual agreement". After World War II, the organization faced criticism for the "heavy involvement by the OSIA in Mussolini's Fascist propaganda campaign in the 1920s and 1930s".

OSIA has been involved in promoting immigration legislation, assisting in the assimilation process, supporting cooperation, trade, and diplomatic relations between the United States and Italy, initiating social and fraternal events, encouraging educational achievement through scholarships, serving local communities through a variety of cultural events and raising funds for local charities, and providing low-cost group financial investments and insurance.

== See also ==
- Fascism in the United States
- Unico National
