= Polizzi Generosa =

- Comune
- Comune di Polizzi Generosa
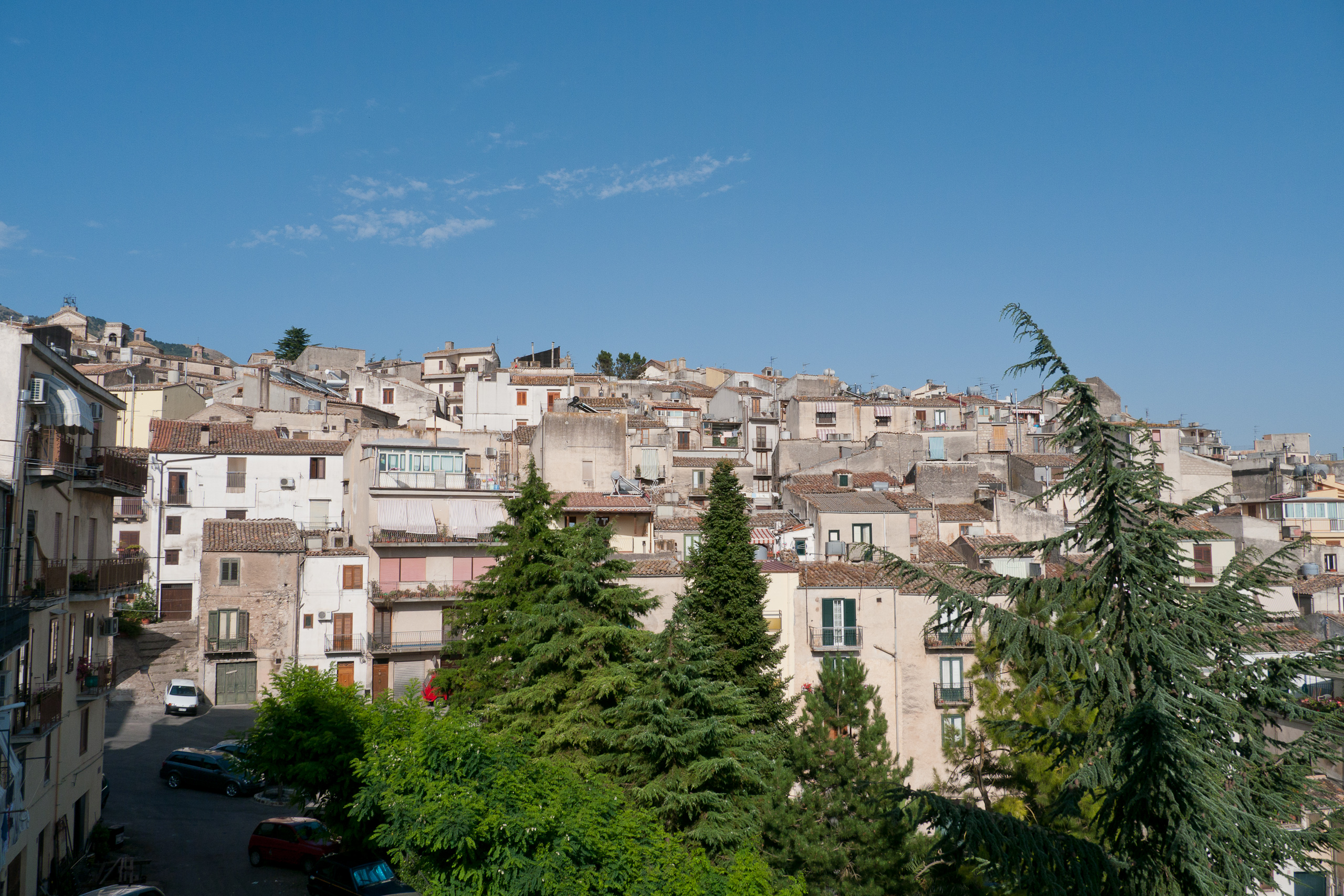

- Coat of arms

- Location within Italy Location within Sicily
- Coordinates: 37°48′43″N 14°00′14″E
- Country: Italy
- Region: Sicily
- Metropolitan city: Palermo (PA)
- Frazioni: Contrada Case Alberì

Government
  - Mayor: Gandolfo Librizzi

Area
  - Total: 134.66 km^{2} (51.99 sq mi)
- Elevation: 917 m (3,009 ft)

Population (1 January 2021)
  - Total: 3,045
  - Density: 22.61/km^{2} (58.57/sq mi)
- Demonym: Polizzani
- Time zone: UTC+1 (CET)
  - Summer (DST): UTC+2 (CEST)
- Postal code: 90028
- Dialing code: 0921
- Patron saint: Gandolfo da Binasco
- Saint day: Third sunday of September
- Website: Official website

Polizzi Generosa is a town and comune in the Metropolitan City of Palermo on the island of Sicily, southern Italy. Located in the Madonie Mountains at an elevation of 917 meters, the town is part of the Madonie Regional Natural Park, a UNESCO Global Geopark recognized for its ecological, geological, and cultural significance.

== Etymology ==
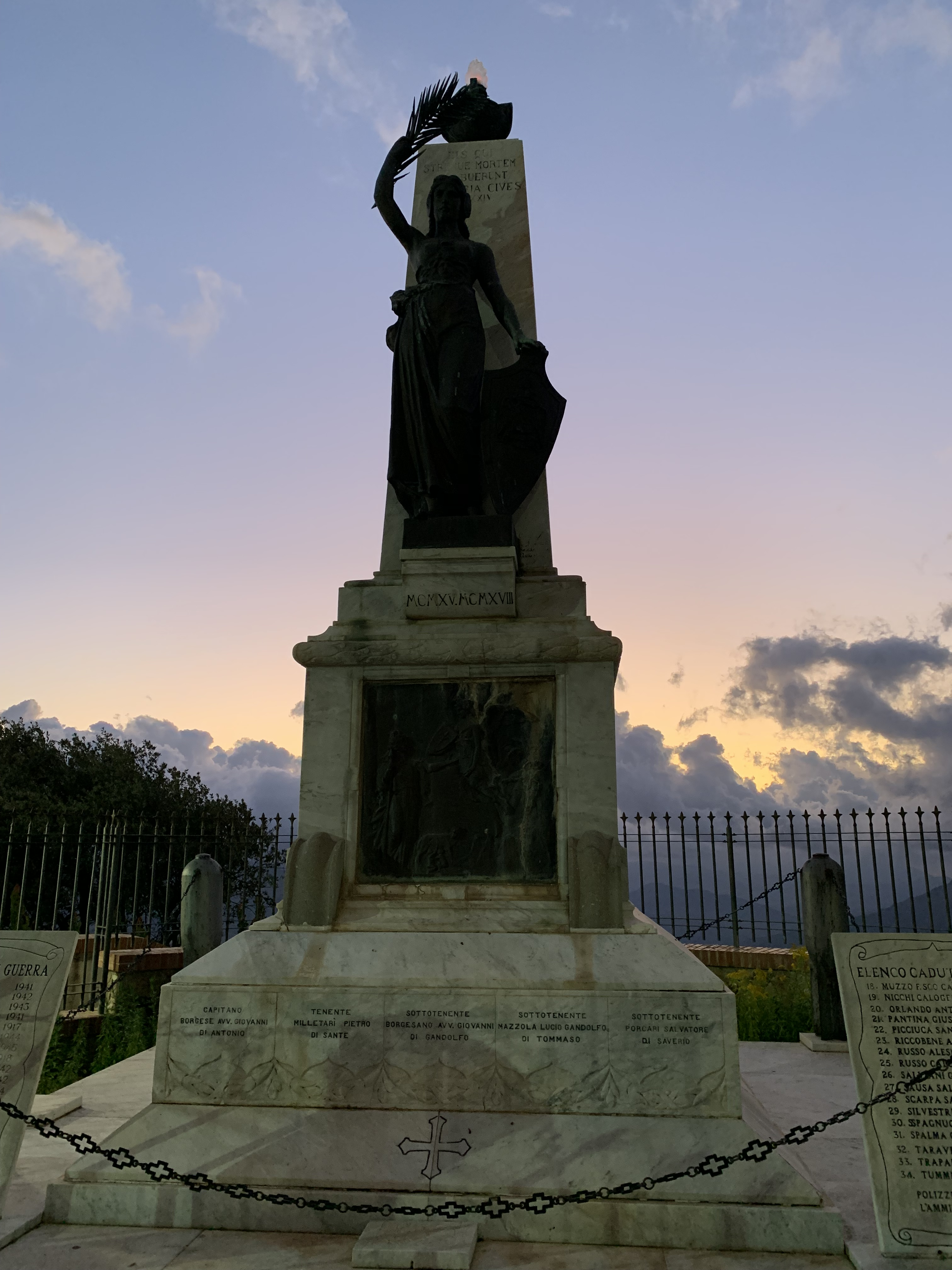
Created by Domenico Zora, it honors the town’s ancient name and serves as a symbol of memory—linking mythological roots with remembrance of those lost in war.

The name Polizzi is believed to derive from the Greek Polis Isis, meaning "City of Isis." This possible reference to the Egyptian goddess Isis suggests early Hellenic religious influence and hints at the area's ancient spiritual significance.

== History ==
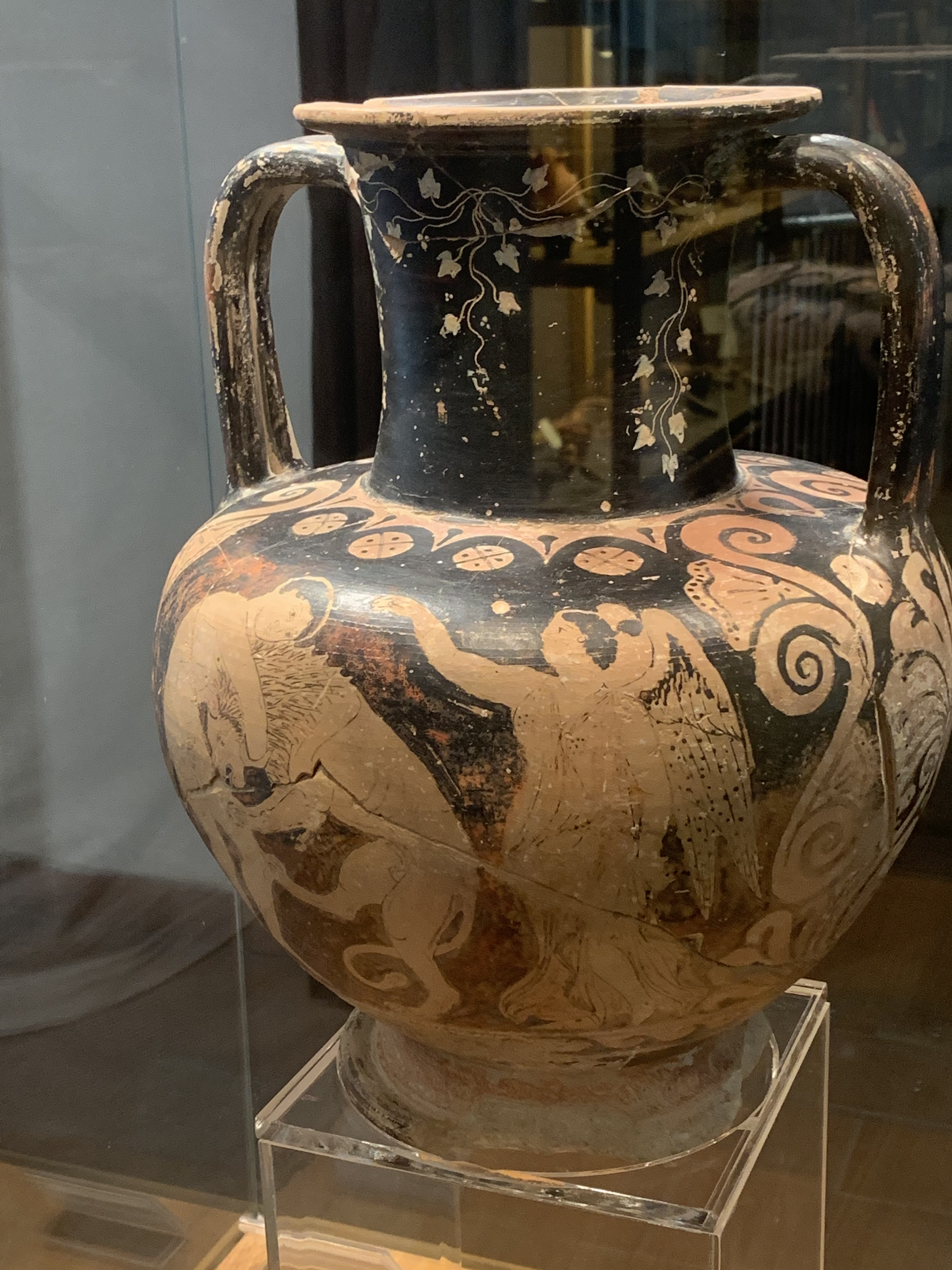
Vaso Civico Museo Archeologico, Polizzi Generosa

Archaeological evidence attests to continuous human presence in the area of Polizzi Generosa since at least the 6th century BCE. Excavations have uncovered coins linked to the nearby Greek colony of Himera, as well as imported amphorae and pottery that point to active trade and cultural exchange in the early Classical period.

Significant Carthaginian artifacts have also been found, including military fittings and ceramics, indicating the site’s integration into the Carthaginian defensive network during the Punic period. By the 4th century BCE, Polizzi’s elevated position made it a strategic military post guarding inland routes between the Tyrrhenian coast and the interior Madonie. Archaeological studies of a hoard of coins discovered in the 1950s suggest that the outpost was staffed by Campanian mercenaries in Carthaginian service, a practice well documented in western Sicily at that time.

During construction work in the late 20th century, a Hellenistic necropolis was uncovered on the outskirts of the modern town. The burial complex contained amphorae, fine ceramics, and other grave goods, many of which are now preserved in the local archaeological collection, underscoring Polizzi Generosa’s importance as both a cultural and commercial node in the Madonie during the Classical and Hellenistic eras.

By the 4th century BCE, the site’s strategic location—positioned between Carthaginian and Syracusan domains—likely led to its use as a military outpost. Archaeological findings include a hoarded stash of coins discovered in the 1950s, suggesting the presence of a Carthaginian fortress manned by mercenaries from Campania.

The modern town developed during the Norman conquest of Sicily around the fortress built by Count Roger I in 1076; remnants of that medieval castle, located atop the hill in what is now Piazza Castello, are still visible. Historical records note that Al-Idrisi, in 1150, described “the castle of Polizzi rising above a high peak”; by 1356, Francesco Ventimiglia is documented as serving as castellan, and in 1558, the historian Fazello referred to the structure as a “rock still standing.” The castle remained reasonably intact until the early 19th century, when progressive decay and the reuse of its stones for new construction led to the partial disappearance of its walls and chapel ruins, including the remains of a 15th-century Palatine chapel obscured near the Church of Santa Maria del Castello.

In 1234, Frederick II, Holy Roman Emperor, bestowed the title "Generosa" on the town in recognition of its loyalty, cultural refinement, and generosity—reportedly because the town provided him with more arms, men, horses, and grain than even Palermo.

During the Middle Ages and Renaissance, Polizzi Generosa emerged as a notable center of regional aristocracy, legal scholarship, and ecclesiastical authority. Its elevated position within the Madonie Mountains and its proximity to trade and pilgrimage routes enhanced both its cultural and strategic importance. Unlike many Sicilian towns that were controlled by a single feudal lord, Polizzi was unique in being home to multiple baronial families and, at times, a count or direct royal administration. This pluralistic model of governance—though rare—could also be found in a few other strategic or prosperous Sicilian centers, such as Enna, Cefalù, and Noto, where royal and noble powers often intertwined. However, Polizzi distinguished itself by sustaining this multi-baronial structure for centuries, fostering a remarkable degree of local autonomy and civic engagement. This pluralistic power structure fostered a remarkable degree of local autonomy and patronage, with successive noble lineages endowing churches, monasteries, and civic projects that solidified Polizzi as a distinctive locus of baronial influence in central Sicily.

Polizzi also gained a reputation for producing highly educated notaries, jurists, and clerics, many of whom were trained at the University of Palermo or in prestigious ecclesiastical colleges. These men went on to serve not only in Palermo and Cefalù but also in the Roman Curia, extending the town’s intellectual reach well beyond its borders. The Codex Polizzano, a 15th-century manuscript collection of legal and notarial texts produced locally, remains a testament to this enduring intellectual tradition and is preserved in regional archives. Local monastic institutions, including Benedictine and Franciscan houses, were deeply integrated into the town’s scholarly life, promoting religious study, preserving historical records, and fostering connections with other cultural centers in Sicily and beyond.

This intellectual and spiritual legacy was so pronounced that, centuries later, Giuseppe Antonio Borgese—himself a native of Polizzi—famously described it as “a village of scholars and saints.” Today, that legacy continues to set Polizzi Generosa apart, distinguishing it as a place where aristocratic power, civic ambition, and intellectual achievement uniquely converged in the history of Sicily.

== Modern History and Culture ==
During the late 19th century, Polizzi Generosa experienced a cultural and economic revival, with improved infrastructure and thriving artisanal trades revitalizing its status as a regional marketplace and waypoint.

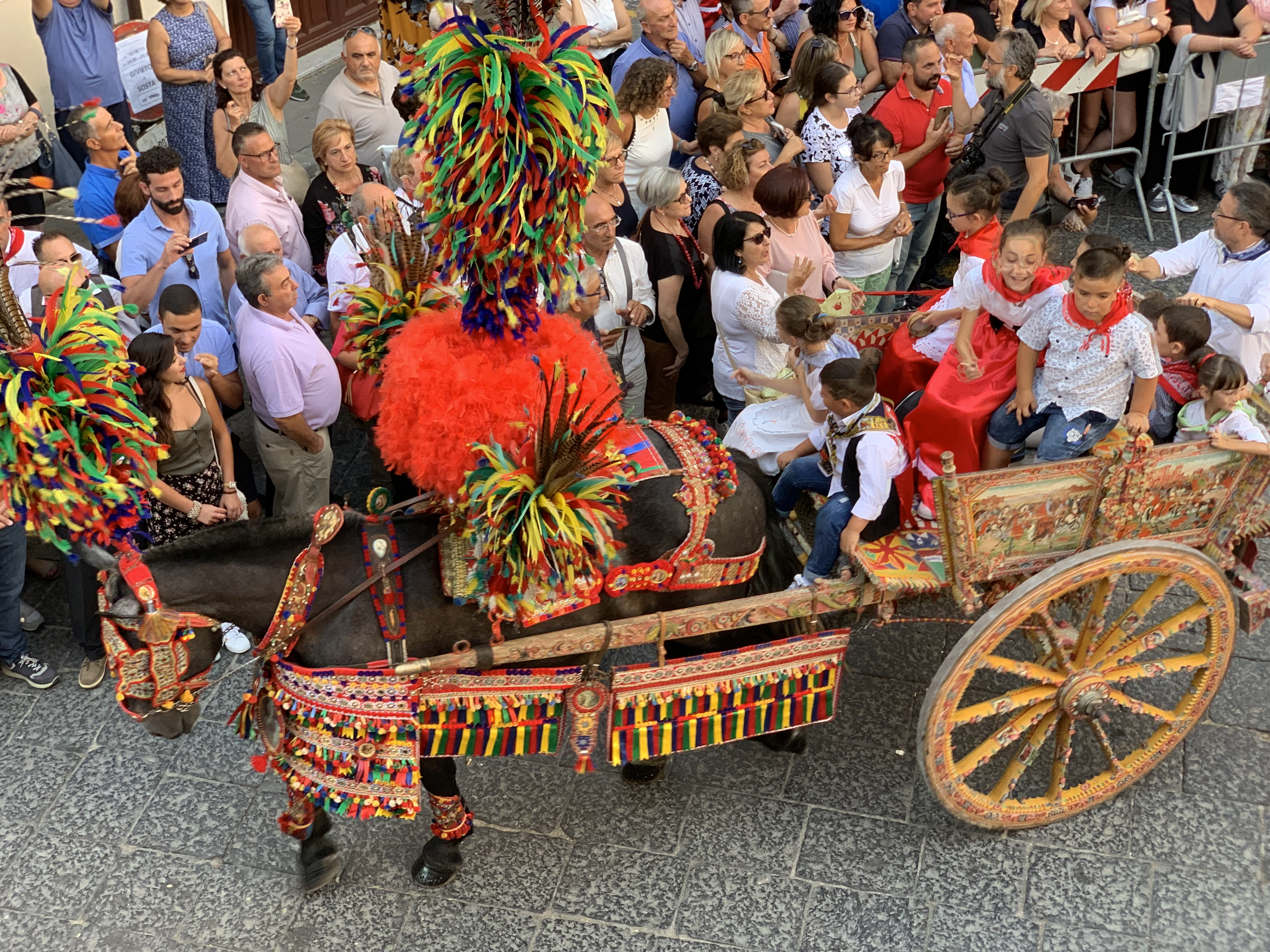
Hazelnut Festival - Polizzi Generosa

Today, the town harmonizes its rich medieval heritage with living cultural traditions and natural splendor. The annual Sagra delle Nocciole (hazelnut festival) celebrates local folklore, cuisine, and music, drawing visitors from across Sicily. Situated within the Madonie Regional Natural Park, Polizzi remains a gateway to scenic hiking, regional archaeology, and unique biodiversity.

== Geography and UNESCO Geopark ==
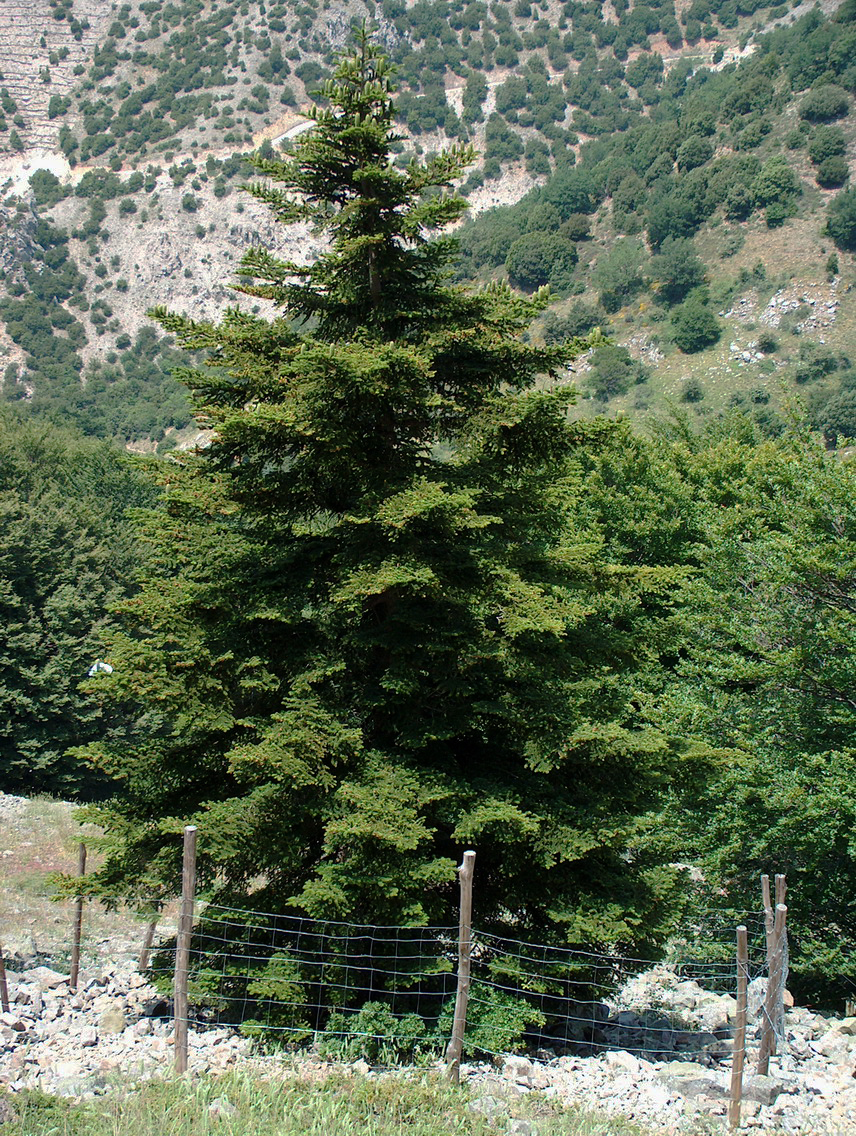
The endangered Abies nebrodensis, endemic to the Madonie Mountains above Polizzi Generosa.

Polizzi Generosa is located within the boundaries of the Madonie Regional Natural Park, which was designated a UNESCO Global Geopark in 2015. The Madonie Mountains host over 1,600 plant species, including nearly half of Sicily’s endemic flora. Other species include important geological formations that span more than 200 million years. The park supports traditional land use systems such as hazelnut orchards, transhumance, and manna harvesting. The park is home to the Abies nebrodensis, a critically endangered fir tree found only in a small grove above Polizzi Generosa. Other rare species include wild orchids, Viola nebrodensis, and the Malus crescimannoi wild apple. In Piano Pomo, visitors can see monumental holly trees towering over 14 meters tall—among the tallest of their kind in Europe.

== Cultural and Artistic Heritage ==
=== Commenda of the Knights of Malta ===
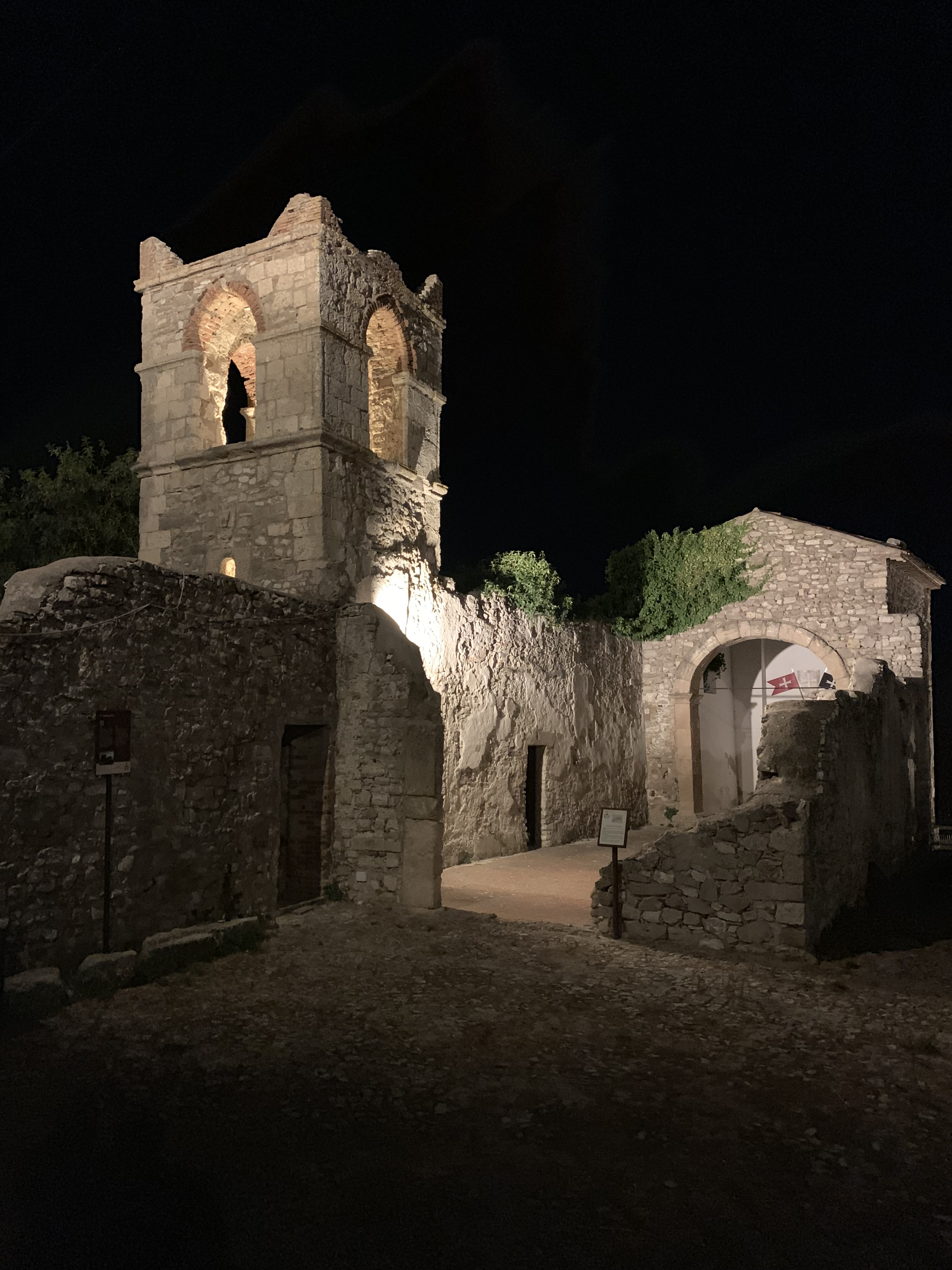
Ruins of the medieval Commenda of the Knights of Malta, Polizzi Generosa.

On the outskirts of Polizzi Generosa stands the Commenda, the ruins of the medieval commandery of the Order of Knights of Malta, established by Hospitallers in 1177 and rebuilt in the 15th century. Once one of the richest commanderies in the Priory of Messina, it functioned as a religious hospice and pilgrimage station. Notable for its stone bell tower and Gothic-arched entryway, the Commenda is one of the few remaining inland examples of medieval Hospitaller architecture in Sicily.

=== Chiesa Madre di Santa Maria Maggiore ===
The façade of Chiesa Madre di Santa Maria Maggiore, which houses the two triptychs.

The Chiesa Madre is Polizzi Generosa’s principal church. Built originally during the Norman period and rebuilt in Baroque style in the 17th century, it features twin bell towers, a clock, and a grand staircase. The interior houses two significant triptychs:

==== Trittico di Antonello de Saliba ====
A Renaissance triptych attributed to Antonello de Saliba (c. 1466–c. 1535), nephew or pupil of Antonello da Messina. The central panel depicts the Madonna and Child enthroned, flanked by saints and predella scenes of the Passion. The work blends early Renaissance perspective with Byzantine iconographic tradition, characteristic of de Saliba’s style.

==== Trittico Fiammingo ====
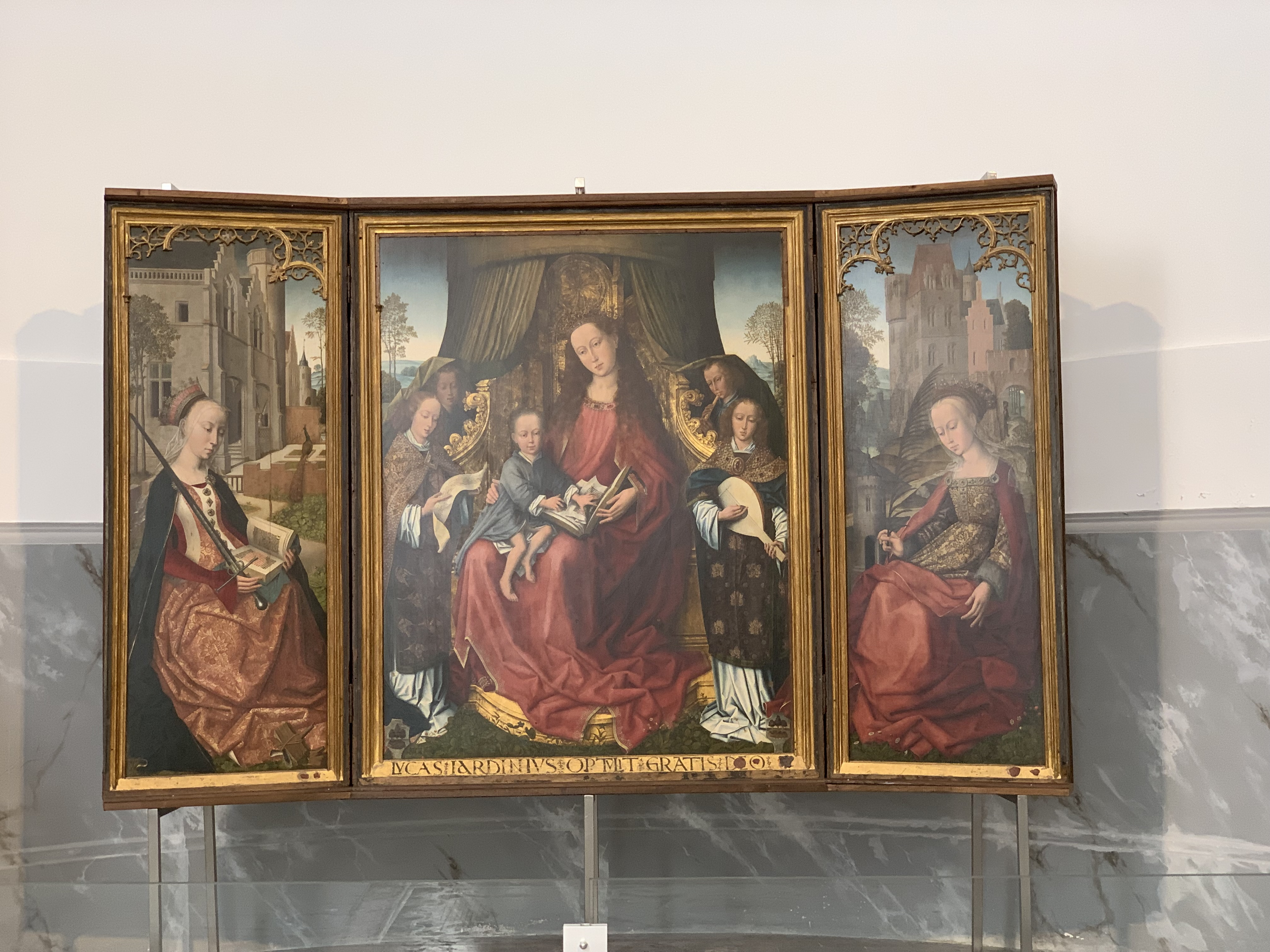
Flemish triptych in the Chiesa Madre, Polizzi Generosa, late 15th century. It features the Madonna and Child with saints, painted in fine detail. A rare example of Netherlandish art in inland Sicily, likely brought via noble or church patronage.

Also housed in the church is a late‑15th‑century Flemish-style triptych (Trittico Fiammingo), attributed to a Netherlandish workshop active in Brussels. The central Madonna and Child panel is flanked by female saints in richly detailed landscapes. The work heralds the influence of Rogier van der Weyden’s school and is particularly rare in inland Sicily, reflecting historic transnational patronage during the Spanish‑Habsburg era.

Both triptychs remain in situ and are protected by the Sicilian Superintendency for Cultural Heritage.

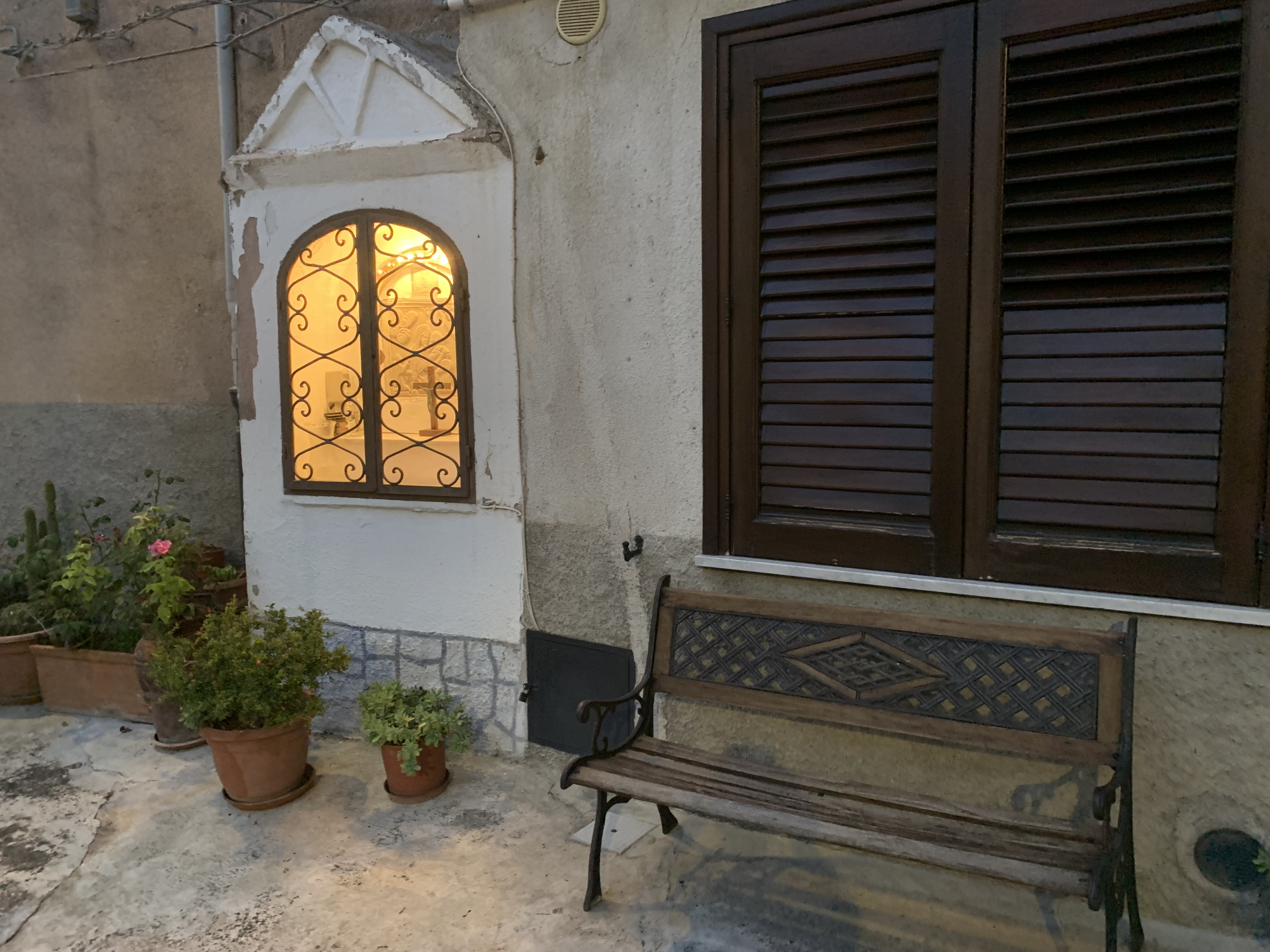

== Prominent People of Polizzi Generosa ==
=== Giuseppe Antonio Borgese (1882–1952) ===
Giuseppe Antonio Borgese was born in Polizzi Generosa and later became a leading literary critic, novelist, and political thinker. After refusing to swear allegiance to the Fascist regime in 1931, he relocated to the United States, where he taught at the University of Chicago and emerged as a key figure in the post-war world federalist movement.

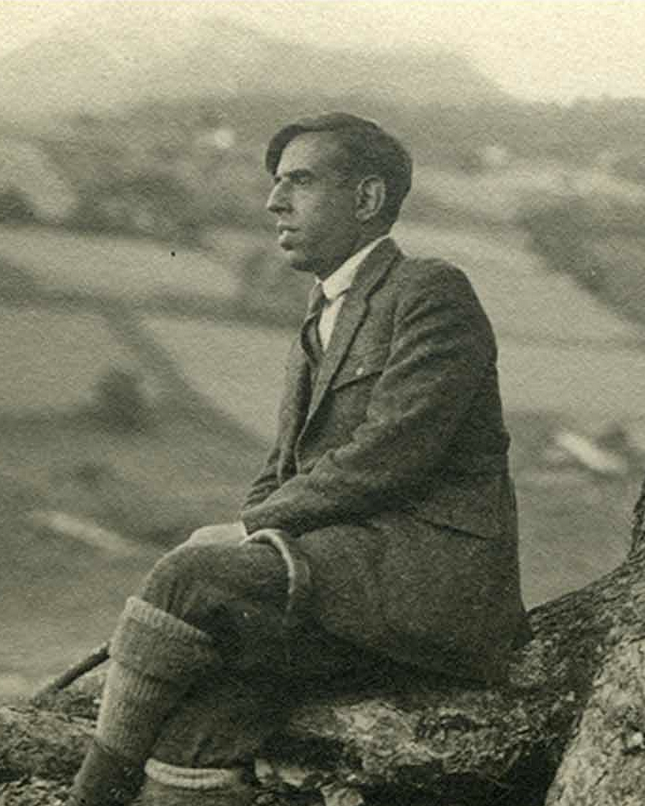
G. A. Borgese a San Vigilio di Marebbe (cropped)

In 1945, Borgese co-founded the Committee to Frame a World Constitution and was the principal author of the 1948 Preliminary Draft of a World Constitution. He believed in the moral necessity of a democratic world government, writing:

“Peace and justice stand or fall together… World government is necessary, therefore it is possible.”

He edited the journal Common Cause, which served as the main publication of the world federalist movement in the late 1940s and early 1950s.

=== San Gandolfo da Binasco (c. 1190–1270) ===
A Franciscan lay brother and missionary preacher, San Gandolfo is the patron saint of Polizzi Generosa. Born near Milan, he traveled through southern Italy as a humble friar before settling in Polizzi, where he lived a life of prayer, poverty, and service. After his death in 1270, his tomb in the Chiesa Madre became a pilgrimage site, and his veneration was embraced locally. His feast is celebrated annually on the third Sunday of September.

=== Rampolla del Tindaro family ===
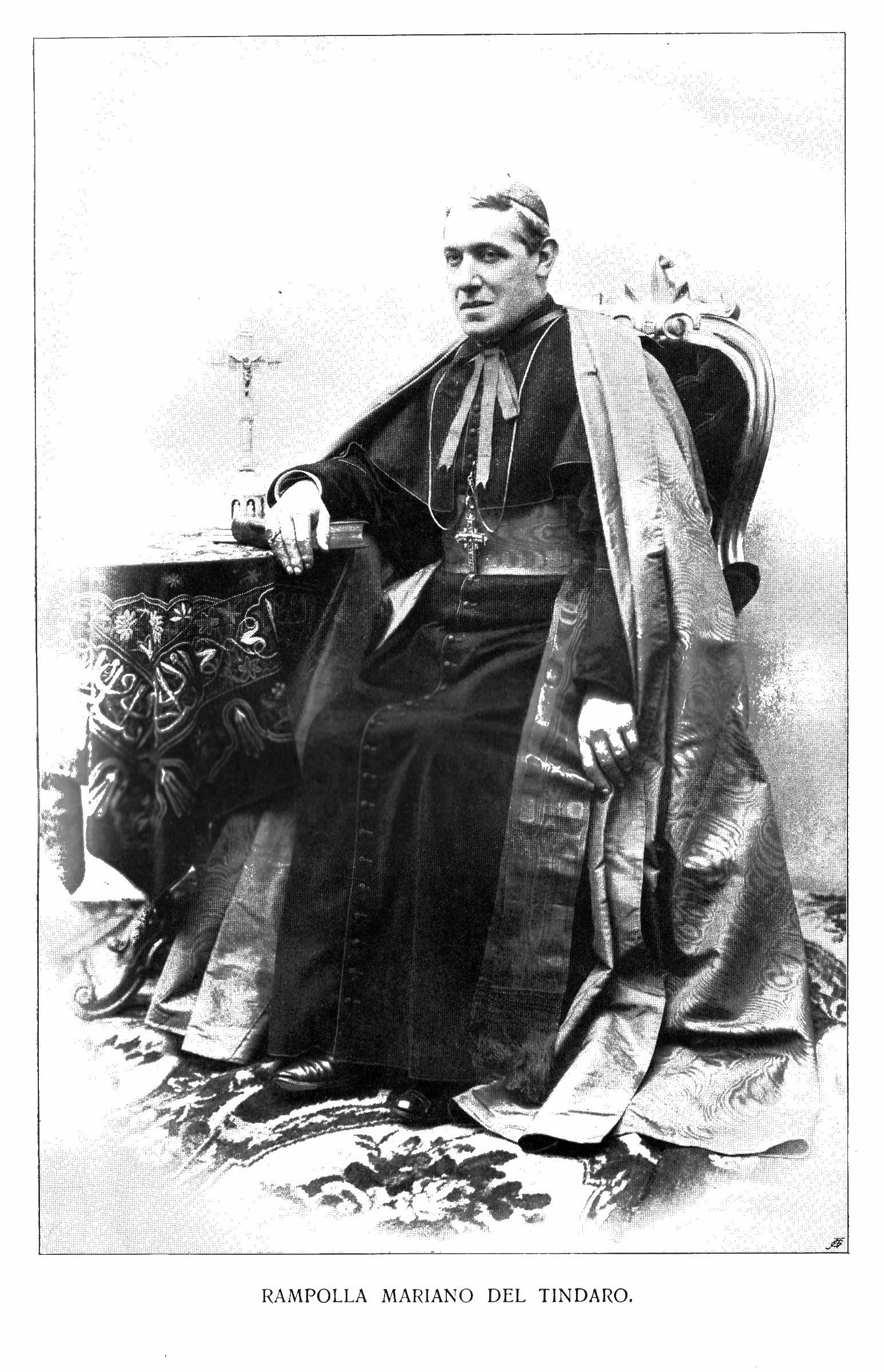
146a Mariano Rampolla del Tindaro

Polizzi Generosa is the ancestral seat of the noble Rampolla del Tindaro family. Cardinal Mariano Rampolla del Tindaro (1843–1913), a prominent Vatican diplomat, served as Secretary of State under Pope Leo XIII and was a serious papal candidate in the 1903 conclave.

=== Domenico Dolce and Dolce & Gabbana ===
Polizzi Generosa is the birthplace of fashion designer Domenico Dolce (born 13 August 1958), co-founder of the global luxury fashion house Dolce & Gabbana. Dolce has frequently credited his upbringing in Polizzi Generosa—with its religious festivals, traditional craftsmanship, baroque architecture, and multigenerational family culture—as a defining influence on his creative vision.

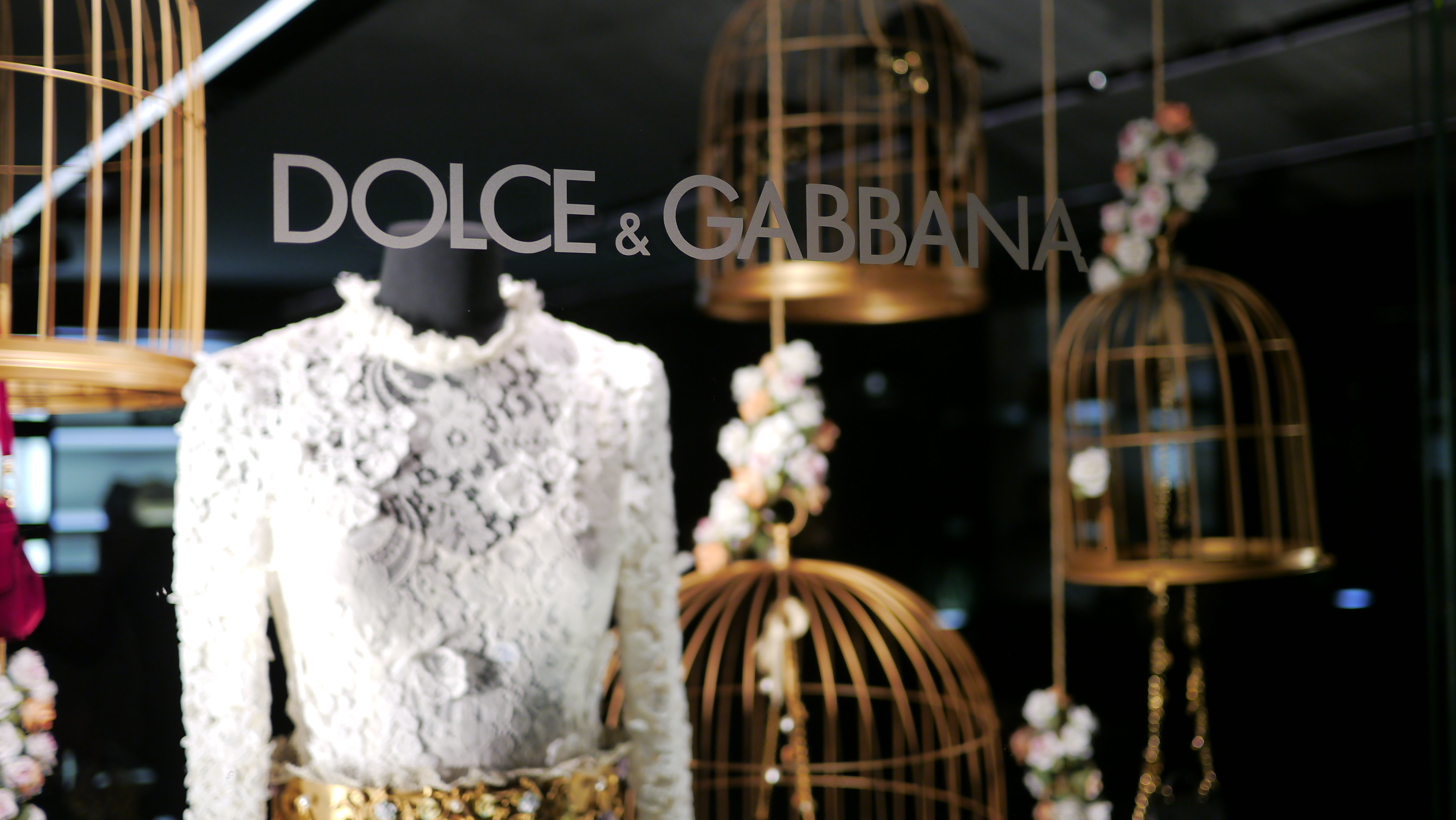

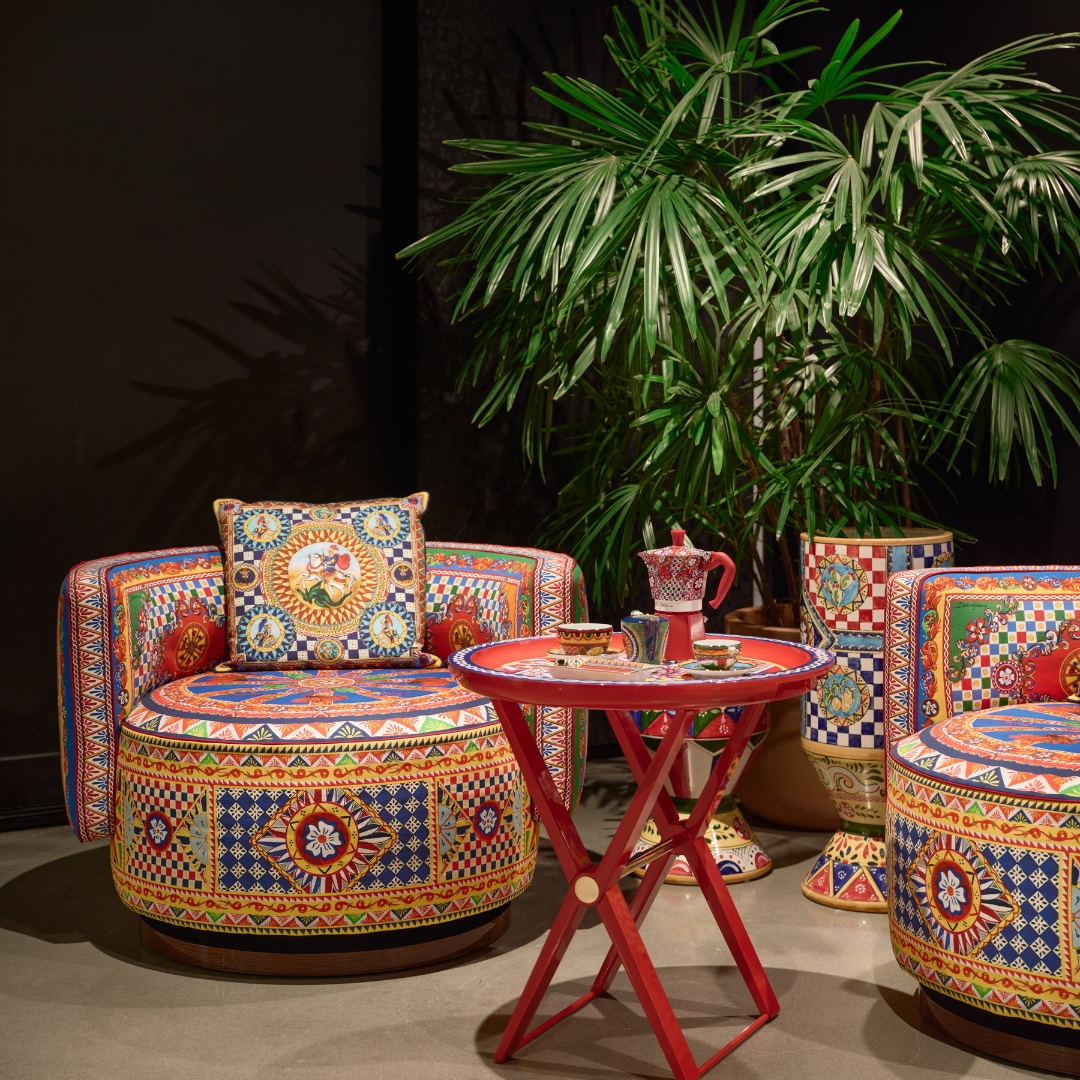
Dolce & Gabbana Casa at Maison Territo store in Montreal

The influence of Polizzi Generosa is evident in Dolce & Gabbana’s signature design elements, including black lace, gold embroidery, religious iconography, and themes of Sicilian motherhood and family. Dolce & Gabbana have also hosted multiple haute couture “Alta Moda” shows in Sicily to showcase regional traditions and artisanship.

Dolce remains actively connected to his hometown. He founded the 5 Cuori Foundation (Fondazione P.G. 5 Cuori) in Polizzi Generosa to support local initiatives in the areas of culture, education, and community welfare.

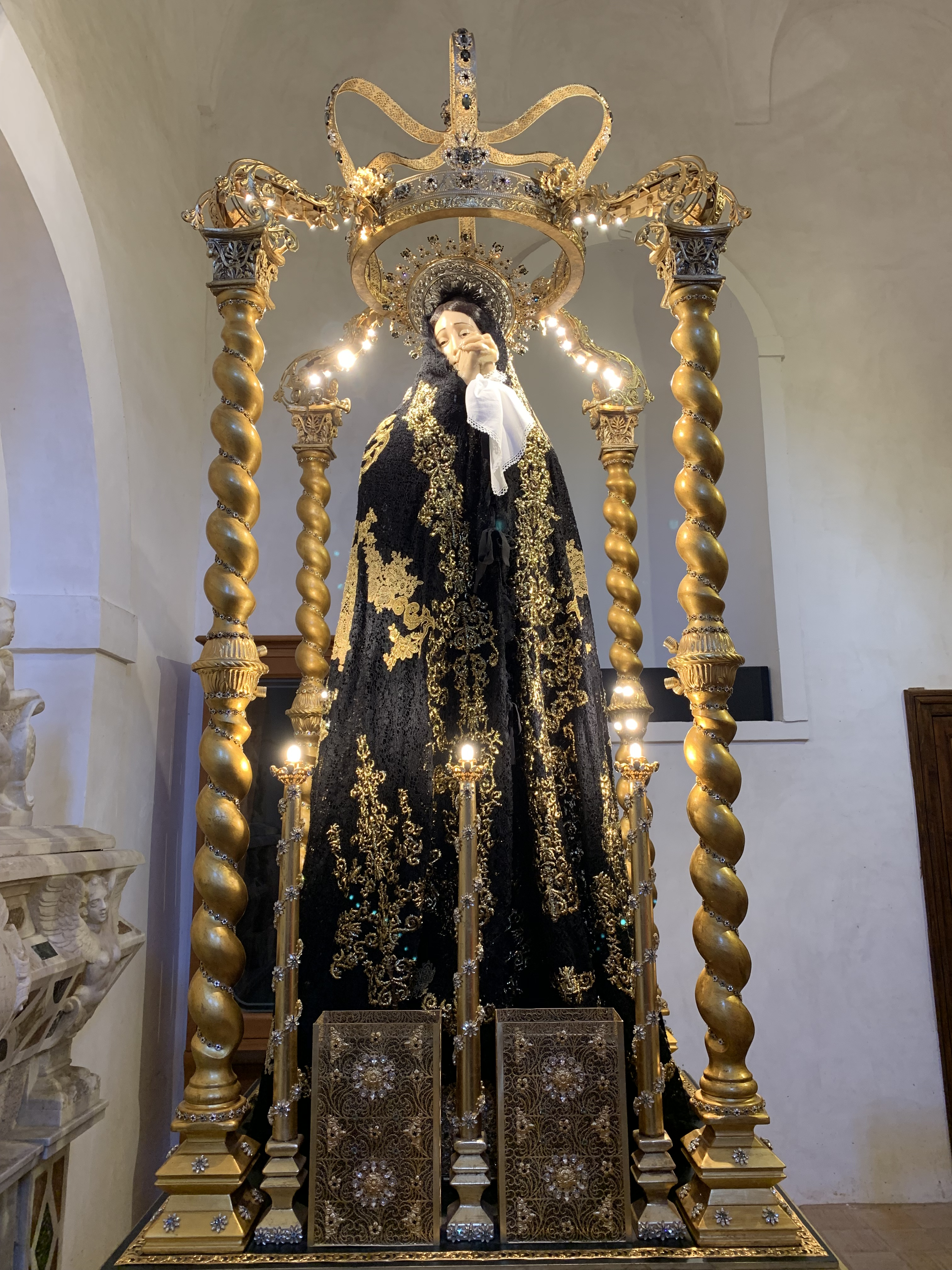
In 2014, Domenico Dolce, designed a black and gold mantle for this statue. Inspired by Sicilian-Andalusian baroque, it echoes designs from the brand’s 2012 Milan Fashion Week collection.

The statue of the Madonna Addolorata, housed in the Chiesa di Santa Maria della Grazia in Polizzi Generosa, is a rare example of Andalusian wax sculpture—one of only five known in Sicily. Deeply revered by the local community, the statue is central to the Good Friday procession.

In 2014, Domenico Dolce, designed and donated an ornate black-and-gold mantle for the statue. Inspired by Sicilian and Andalusian baroque motifs, the garment draws directly from the visual themes of Dolce & Gabbana’s 2012 Milan Fashion Week collection, which celebrated the designers’ Sicilian roots. In addition to the mantle, Dolce oversaw the design of the Vara (processional platform), adorned with Swarovski crystals and golden elements, and outfitted all 40 bearers in custom ceremonial attire—black suits, white shirts, gold tie clips and cufflinks, and traditional capes.

A second mantle, used in alternating years, was created decades earlier by Saverio Dolce, Domenico’s father and a respected tailor in Polizzi. This black satin cloak, embroidered with black glass beads, was also made for the Madonna Addolorata. A member of the local confraternity, Saverio likely passed his deep devotional ties to his son. The dual mantles represent a family legacy of faith, craftsmanship, and cultural identity within the town.

Dolce & Gabbana is widely considered one of the most prominent fashion houses in the world. In 2024, the brand was valued at over USD 3 billion and ranked among the top 50 global fashion brands by the FashionUnited Brand Index.

=== Celestina Salamone Cristodaro ===
Celestina Salamone Cristodaro, respected local historian, wrote deeply researched local histories of Polizzi Generosa, including Polizzi d’Altri Tempi: Realtà e Suggestione (1987) and Polizzi Del Passato (1990), which remain essential resources on the town’s cultural and architectural heritage.

== Polizzani In The United States ==
In the early 20th century, Elizabeth Street in Lower Manhattan was a hub for Sicilian immigrants, many of whom came from Polizzi Generosa. Author Martin Scorsese recalled that "all the people from Polizzi moved to Elizabeth Street – all in one building," where they maintained a village-like community structure, supporting each other socially and culturally.

=== San Gandolfo Devotion and Festivals ===
Polizzi Generosa’s patron saint, San Gandolfo, has remained a central figure for the town’s diaspora communities in New York. Beginning in the early 20th century, immigrants from Polizzi established a celebration in Manhattan’s Little Italy, centered on Elizabeth Street. The statue of San Gandolfo in the Church of the Most Precious Blood was donated by the Polizzani community and became the focal point for an annual festa honoring the saint. These accounts illustrate how Italians from Polizzi Generosa clustered tightly in Manhattan's Little Italy, replicating their hometown’s social structure and preserving a strong communal identity even amid the challenges of urban immigrant life.

When Polizzani families moved from Manhattan to Brooklyn and Queens, they carried their traditions with them. Societa Polizzi Generosa social club was established on Wyckoff Avenue in Ridgewood, Queens, where membership flourished. This club supported its members and other philanthropic causes while hosting special events for the Polizzani community.

Today, San Gandolfo festivals are held annually in Middle Village and nearby neighborhoods, organized by members of the Società di Polizzi Generosa and other community groups. The celebrations feature processions, Mass, and communal gatherings that closely reflect the feast in Polizzi Generosa itself, preserving strong cultural and religious bonds between the diaspora and their ancestral town.

== Notable People with Polizzani Heritage ==
- Antonio Ferraro (c. 1592 – after 1629), composer and organist born in Polizzi Generosa
- Director Martin Scorsese an acclaimed American filmmaker known for his influential contributions to cinema, particularly in the crime and drama genres. His paternal grandparents were born in Polizzi Generosa. His work is marked by bold visual style, complex character studies, and iconic films such as Taxi Driver, Goodfellas, and Raging Bull.
- Vincenzo Sellaro, MD was born in Polizzi Generosa and in 1905 founded the Order of the Sons of Italy in America in Little Italy, New York. Today, this organization is known as the Order of the Sons and Daughters of Italy in America and is the oldest organization supporting Italian Immigrants and Italian Heritage in America.
- The writer, Carol Lunetta Cianca, was born here in 1898. At 100 years of age she published an acclaimed autobiography that described the back story of her undercover experiences on behalf of the United States during World War II.
- Actor, Fausto Russo Alesi, born 1973, David di Donatello Awards (2023): Nominated for Best Supporting Actor for Exterior Night (Esterno Notte). Nastro d'Argento / Silver Ribbon (2023): Nominated for Best Actor (Protagonist) for Kidnapped (Rapito) has familial ties to Polizzi Generosa.
- Character actor Vincent Schiavelli (One Flew Over The Cuckoo's Nest, Amadeus, Ghost) moved to Polizzi for the final years of his life. His grandfather, Andrea Coco was chef to the Rampolla del Tindaro noble family. Schiavelli was also a food and cookbook writer who wrote about Polizzi Generosa and his roots in Many Beautiful Things: Stories and Recipes from Polizzi Generosa. Schiavelli is buried in the Polizzi Generosa cemetery.

== Sources ==
- Maggio, Theresa (2002). The Stone Boudoir: Travels Through The Hidden Villages of Sicily. New York.
- Cutuli, Carmelo (26 December 2023). Vincenzo Sellaro and the Sons of Italy in America. Amazon Digital Services LLC. ISBN 9798873018444.
