= Collesano =

- Comune
- Comune di Collesano
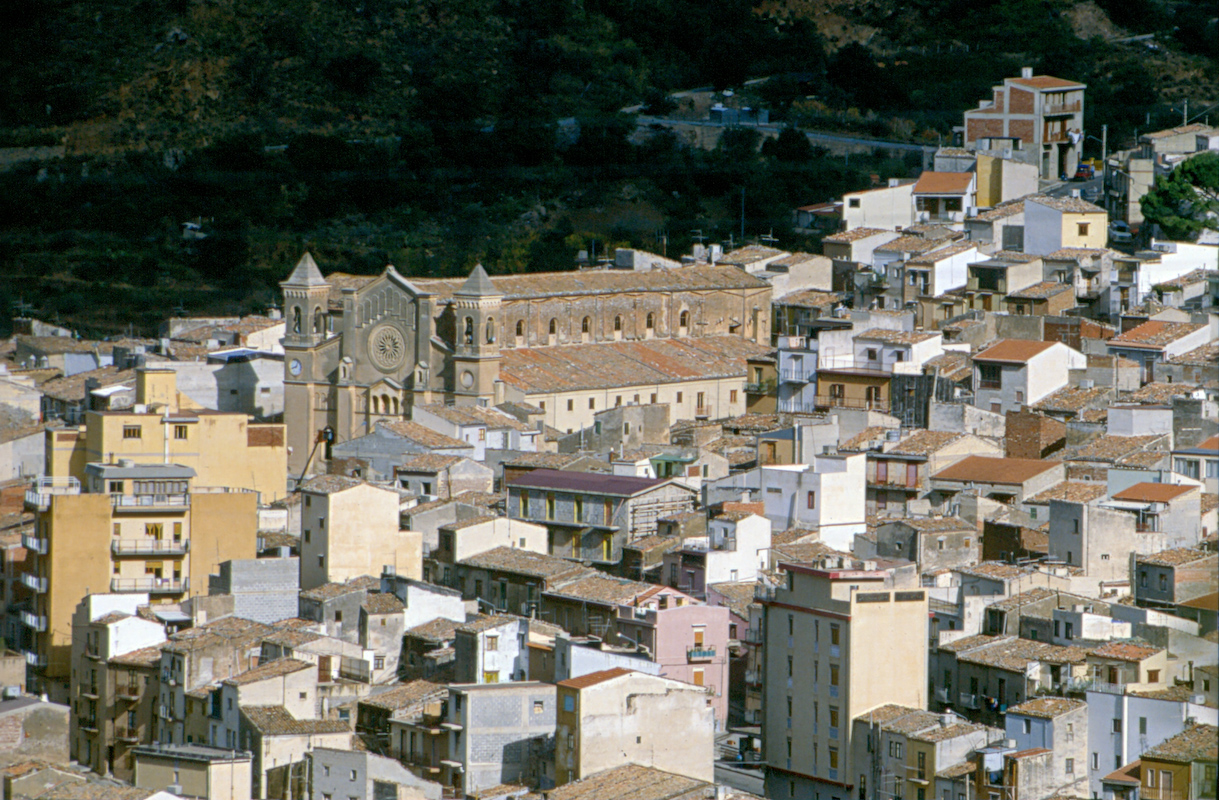

- Coat of arms

- Location within Italy Location within Sicily
- Coordinates: 37°55′N 13°56′E
- Country: Italy
- Region: Sicily
- Metropolitan city: Palermo (PA)

Government
  - Mayor: Giovanni Battista Meli

Area
  - Total: 108.17 km^{2} (41.76 sq mi)
- Elevation: 468 m (1,535 ft)

Population (2007)
  - Total: 4,123
  - Density: 38.12/km^{2} (98.72/sq mi)
- Time zone: UTC+1 (CET)
  - Summer (DST): UTC+2 (CEST)
- Postal code: 90016
- Dialing code: 0921
- Patron saint: Madonna of the Miracles
- Saint day: 26 May
- Website: Official website

Collesano (Ancient Greek: Κολασσαέων, romanized: Kolassaéon; Greek: Κολεσάνο, romanized: Kolesáno Sicilian: Culisanu) is a small town in the Metropolitan City of Palermo, Sicily. It is situated roughly 70 kilometres (43 miles) from the provincial capital of Palermo. It lies in the Madonie Park between the hills and the Tyrrhenian Sea and is also on the Targa Florio racing circuit since its beginning (1906). The town owns the official Targa Florio Museum.

== History ==
The long history of Collesano relates to the history of original inhabitants of Sicily, the Sicani, people coming from Spain, and later to the town of Imera, the hometown of the poet Stesichoros, the old Greek town founded by Chalcidians and destroyed by Hannibal[?] in 208 B.C.[212 - 210 more likely].

The Arab geographer al-Idrisi speaks of Collesano, which he described in "The Book of Roger". He tells of the destruction of the town Qal'at as-Sirat situated on the top of Golden Mountain by the Norman king Ruggero II. Afterwards the town was rebuilt and was called Bagherino. In the Middle Ages, the name was changed to Golisano and then to Collesano.

Many aristocratic families have been involved in the governance of the town, such as the countess Adelicia de Alife, niece of the Norman king Roger II of Sicily; the count of Avenel; the Ventimiglia's; the Cicala's; the Centelle's; the de Folch Cardona; the Aragona; the Moncada's; and the Ferrandina's. Monuments to visit include: the ruins of the Norman castle; the old ceramic manufactory; the Basilica of St. Peter; the churches of St. Mary "the Old", St. James, St. Sebastian and Fabian, St. Dominic or St. Mary "the New", and of St. Mary of Jesus; the Pedaly's Abbey and the Targa Florio Museum which many old-time car clubs stop at during their event on the Madonie Circuit. Collesano is also famous for its ceramic artwork and the Mystery Plays: "la Cercha", a procession with the Penitentes organized every year in Holy Week; and "la Casazza", the "Cycle of Collesano" that has been presented five times in the last century.

== International relations ==
=== Twin towns – Sister cities ===
Collesano is twinned with:

- Yverdon-les-Bains, Switzerland
