= Tethys Research Institute =

Italian non-profit research organisation

- Established: 1986; 40 years ago
- President: Simone Panigada
- Location: Viale G.B. Gadio, 2, Milan, Italy
- Website: tethys.org

The Tethys Research Institute (official name: Istituto Tethys ONLUS) is a non-profit research organisation founded in 1986 to support marine conservation through science and public awareness and by participating in the international conservation process. Tethys' activities are mainly carried out in the Mediterranean Sea, although research programmes have been conducted also in the Black Sea, the North Atlantic Ocean, the Caribbean, the Red Sea and Antarctica. The results of these activities have been presented in scientific publications as well as in meetings, workshops and conferences.

== Mission statement ==
Tethys' mission is the conservation of the marine environment and its biodiversity, by supporting national and international marine conservation policies and processes with robust scientific knowledge, and by developing, promoting and implementing public awareness and education activities.

== History ==
The Tethys Research Institute was founded in Milan, Italy, on 31 January 1986 by marine ecologist Giuseppe Notarbartolo di Sciara and Egidio Gavazzi, at the time the publisher of the Italian magazine AQVA. The organisation's name was inspired by a figure of Greek mythology, the sea goddess Tethys, daughter of Uranus and Gaia and wife of Oceanus. The Mediterranean Sea is the modern remnant of the prehistoric Tethys Ocean. Since 1995 the institute's headquarters have been established in the premises of the Civic Aquarium of Milan, on the basis of an agreement with the City Council.

Since its foundation, Tethys has promoted research activities on marine mammals, such as cetaceans (whales and dolphins) and the endangered Mediterranean monk seal, although investigations have also extended to devil rays and sea turtles. Over more than three decades of work, Tethys has generated one of the largest datasets on Mediterranean cetaceans. Tethys shares its data with the scientific community and policy makers through several open access platforms such as OBIS, OBIS-SEAMAP, GBIF, EMODNET, and INTERCET.

== Research programmes and techniques ==
Research methods include distance sampling surveys (both from aircraft, drones and vessels) capture-recapture techniques based on long-term photo-identification to estimate population abundance; habitat and distribution time-series studies inclusive of the collection of remotely sensed environmental covariates, bioacoustics, behavioural sampling, remote biopsy sampling for genetic and toxicological analyses, passive tracking techniques, as well as radio and satellite telemetry.

Since 1987 Tethys has been carrying out cetacean surveys in the waters surrounding Italy and adjacent countries. Early boat-based surveys generated the first estimate of relative abundance in the central Mediterranean Sea highlighting the great importance of the Ligurian Sea for whales and dolphins, in comparison to other sectors of the Mediterranean. This was the first indication of the need for the establishment of a cetacean protected area in the North -Western Mediterranean, leading to the proposition of an international sanctuary there, the Pelagos Sanctuary for Mediterranean Marine Mammals.

Since 2009, Tethys has carried out a series of seasonal aerial surveys funded by the Italian Ministry of the Environment and Protection of Land and Sea (MATTM), in cooperation with the International Whaling Commission (IWC) and the Institute for Environmental Protection and Research (ISPRA), to estimate the density and abundance, and monitoring the distribution of cetaceans and other marine mega-vertebrates in the seas around Italy. The surveyed areas included the Ligurian Sea, the Central and Southern Tyrrhenian Sea, portions of the Seas of Corsica and Sardinia, as well as the Ionian Sea and the Gulf of Taranto.

Research is focussed also on collisions between whales and large ships in the Mediterranean and especially in the Pelagos Sanctuary. A study financed by the Permanent Secretariat of the Pelagos Agreement and published in September 2020 (Proposal to develop and evaluate mitigation strategies to reduce the risk of ship strikes to fin and sperm whales in the Pelagos Sanctuary) was carried out in collaboration with British Antarctic Survey, International Fund for Animal Welfare, QuietOceans, Souffleurs d'Ecume, WWF France. Tethys is also a partner in LIFE-SEADETECT, a European collaborative project aimed at reducing the issue of collisions with marine mammals (2022–2026).

=== Long-term research projects ===
==== Adriatic Dolphin Project ====
Tethys has implemented long-term research programmes on Mediterranean marine mammals. The oldest of these, the Adriatic Dolphin Project (ADP), based on the island of Lošinj (Croatia), was run by Tethys from 1987 to 1999, and produced a large body of substantive ecological knowledge on the local population of common bottlenose dolphins (Tursiops truncatus). Concern for the survival of this dolphin population, threatened mainly by a very high level of small vessel traffic during summer, prompted the institute to propose the establishment of a local dolphin protected area. Upon the decision by Tethys to terminate the ADP in 1999, the baton of the scientific and conservation work on the local dolphins was passed to former ADP researchers, founders and co-founders of the Blue World Institute, a Croatian NGO.

==== Cetacean Sanctuary Research ====
The Cetacean Sanctuary Research (CSR) project, established in 1990, is Tethys' second long-term project. It is carried out within the waters of the Pelagos Sanctuary for Mediterranean Marine Mammals, mostly in the Ligurian Sea. The core study area extends over about 25,000 km^{2}, encompassing coastal, slope and pelagic waters between continental Italy and France, and the Island of Corsica. The CSR target species are fin whale (Balaenoptera physalus), sperm whale (Physeter macrocephalus), long-finned pilot whale (Globicephala melas), Risso's dolphin (Grampus griseus), Cuvier's beaked whale (Ziphius cavirostris), striped dolphin (Stenella coeruleoalba), common bottlenose dolphin (Tursiops truncatus) and short-beaked common dolphin (Delphinus delphis). The project focuses on population dynamics, spatial distribution, habitat preferences, behaviour, bioacoustics, photogrammetry, genetics, as well as on the evaluation of long-term environmental changes and monitoring of anthropogenic pressures. The main aim is to produce scientific knowledge to support the conservation of marine mammals.

Studies conducted within the CSR project generated one of the longest time series and one of the largest datasets on Mediterranean cetaceans, allowing to evaluate and detect changes in the species' presence. The data series on Risso's dolphins, among the longest and one of the most important of its kind, allowed to highlight a dramatic decline of this species in the study area. This result significantly contributed to having the Risso's dolphins Mediterranean subpopulation listed as Endangered in the IUCN Red List of Threatened species.

Habitat preferences of cetaceans living in the Pelagos Sanctuary have been described, allowing also to make predictions of the presence probability of the different species.

This information is critical for the management of the Pelagos Sanctuary as it enables vulnerability assessments of marine areas with respect to the existing human pressures. Furthermore, data on the variability of cetaceans' habitat preferences can be used as a basis for the evaluation of the environmental quality of marine ecosystems, as required by the Marine Strategy Framework Directive.

The CSR project has many longstanding collaborations with national and international organisations and research institutes across the Mediterranean. It has been observed that Risso's dolphins and common bottlenose dolphins can cover hundreds of km; sperm whales, over a thousand km, moving from the Strait of Gibraltar to the Ligurian Sea.

Cetaceans' vocalisations are regularly recorded, generating a large acoustic dataset and allowing studies of the vocal repertoire of sperm whales and other species. Behaviour and overall body size could also be inferred from acoustic data in sperm whales.

Research on cetaceans in the Pelagos Sanctuary also revealed an unexpected genetic separation between fin whales occurring in the Ligurian Sea and their North Atlantic conspecifics. Studies based on mtDNA analysis show that the Mediterranean Risso's Dolphin population has been found to be genetically differentiated from the one inhabiting the waters of Azores, United Kingdom and from other oceanic populations. There is also some evidence of a possible Mediterranean subpopulation.

Also surprising diving capabilities of fin whales and long-finned pilot whales have been highlighted; equipped with time-depth recorders, they showed to be able to dive, respectively, to depths >470m and >820m.

The long-term photo-identification study of fin whales in the Pelagos Sanctuary (1990–present) points to the existence of a persistent site fidelity and reaffirms the importance of this area as a major feeding ground and critical habitat for the Mediterranean subpopulation, providing baseline data for targeted conservation and mitigation measures.

A satellite telemetry research programme, funded by the Italian Ministry of the Environment and carried out in collaboration with the International Whaling Commission (IWC), the University of Siena, ISPRA, and the Alaska Fisheries Science Center in Seattle (USA), investigated fine-scale habitat use, movements and migration patterns of fin whales in the Pelagos Sanctuary in September 2012. Results indicate that tagged fin whales remained in the Pelagos Sanctuary summer feeding grounds until late autumn, much longer than expected, most likely due to the unusual climate conditions triggering prolonged productivity and whale feeding activity. Satellite tracking also revealed that the feeding habitat of fin whales extends substantially to the West of the Pelagos Sanctuary's boundaries, well into the Gulf of Lion and into Spanish waters. Fine scale associations with oceanographic features and potential feeding habitats within the Sanctuary were also observed.

Short-term responses of fin whales in the Pelagos Sanctuary to approaching vessels have been described through passive plotting of the whales' tracks with laser range-finder binoculars. Avoidance strategies were observed under disturbance: travel at increased speed, reduction of the time spent at the surface, and switching from supposed feeding behaviour to travelling.

A pilot project aimed at investigating the potential use of a medium fixed-wing aircraft system (RPAS) for monitoring cetaceans, as an alternative method to conventional aerial manned surveys, was launched in 2022. Thanks to a long-lasting collaboration with the Italian Coast Guard, the RPAS, provided by the REACT consortium on behalf of the European Maritime Safety Agency EMSA, was also tested during a preliminary survey in an area within the Pelagos Sanctuary.

==== Ionian Dolphin Project ====
Another long-term project is the Ionian Dolphin Project (IDP) that has been running since 1991 focusing on the conservation of marine mammals in Ionian Greece. The IDP was first conducted from a research vessel (1991–1994), then based on the island of Ithaca (1995), and subsequently transferred to the island of Kalamos (1996–2008). The project field base is currently located in Vonitsa (2006–present), on the southern shore of the Ambracian Gulf.

The IDP is dedicated to the study and conservation of three target species, common bottlenose dolphins (Tursiops truncatus), common dolphins (Delphinus delphis), and Mediterranean monk seals (Monachus monachus). The aim of the project is to produce estimates of the populations' abundance, to investigate species distribution and habitat preferences, and to study the species' behavioural ecology and their interaction with fisheries. Since the early years, the project has also expanded its geographic coverage and nowadays the research is concentrated in three Natura 2000 study areas of Western Greece: the Gulf of Ambracia, the Inner Ionian Sea Archipelago and the Paxos and Antipaxos Islands and surrounding waters.

In the Inner Ionian Sea Archipelago site (Natura 2000 code GR2220003) common dolphins dramatically declined between 1995 and 2007, which has been convincingly linked to overfishing, although impact resulting from an ever-increasing nautical tourism should not be ruled out. In the same area, bottlenose dolphins are found in relatively small numbers, even if they seem to have stable trends. Of about 120 individuals photo-identified, approximately one quarter have shown high levels of site fidelity.

The Ionian Sea is one of the few areas of the Mediterranean Sea where the monk seal can still be predictably encountered, suggesting that the area is part of the species' core habitat. The IDP has gathered strong evidence that some distinctive areas provide key monk seal breeding habitats that appear to be of great importance for the conservation of the species on a Mediterranean scale. The main threats faced by this endangered species in the Inner Ionian Sea Archipelago derive, to a large extent, from disturbance by boat-based tourism, and possibly also from negative interactions with fishing activities.

The IDP monk seal photo-identification catalogue is updated on a yearly basis and is available online. On-going monk seal research incorporates new technologies, namely UAVs (drones) and soundtraps (passive acoustic monitoring) in collaboration with the Marine Mammal Research Program of the University of Hawaii and with the Sea Mammal Research Unit of the University of St. Andrews, respectively.

In the semi-enclosed, highly degraded, Gulf of Ambracia (Natura 2000 code GR2110001) the IDP studies a resident population of 150 common bottlenose dolphins that display a unique behaviour and ecology. The research documents how the local dolphin community interacts with its environment and how human activities may influence its conservation status. This work led to the listing of the Bottlenose Dolphin Gulf of Ambracia subpopulation as Critically Endangered in the IUCN Red List of Threatened Species.

In the waters surrounding the islands of Paxos and Antipaxos (Natura 2000 code GR2230004) a series of preliminary opportunistic surveys started in 2015. Since 2020, these waters became the third IDP's study area. Data gathered in these years showed that bottlenose, common and striped dolphins are regularly present, and monk seals are occasionally sighted around the numerous caves in the western side of Paxos island. In the western limit of the Nat2000 site, where the slope is more pronounced and waters drop beyond 1,000 m depth, a few Cuvier's beaked whales have also been spotted.

== Conservation actions ==
In addition to making the results of its research projects available to marine conservation and management activities, Tethys' members are actively participating in the international conservation process in collaboration with many intergovernmental organisations, including the Convention on Biological Diversity (CBD), the Convention on Migratory Species (CMS), the Barcelona Convention for the Protection of the Marine Environment and the Coastal Region of the Mediterranean, the Agreement on the Conservation of Cetaceans in the Black Sea, Mediterranean Sea and Contiguous Atlantic Area (ACCOBAMS), the International Whaling Commission (IWC), the International Union for Conservation of Nature (IUCN), the Society for Marine Mammalogy, and the European Cetacean Society. As members of the IUCN Red List Authority for cetaceans, and in collaboration with the Red List Secretariat, Tethys' experts have contributed to the inclusion in the Red List of Threatened Species of a number of Mediterranean taxa, such as the regional sub-populations of fin whales, short-beaked common dolphins, sperm whales, Risso's dolphins, common bottlenose dolphins, and the spinetail devil ray (Mobula mobular).

In terms of practical conservation on the ground, based on the results of its research cruises in 1987-89 Tethys first conceived and proposed the creation of an iconic protected area, the Pelagos Sanctuary for Mediterranean Marine Mammals, the world's first marine protected area established beyond national jurisdiction. With the support of the European Association Rotary for the Environment, and in collaboration with the NGO Europe Conservation, on 2 March 1991 Tethys presented the "Pelagos Sanctuary" idea to H.S.H. the Prince Rainier III of Monaco. This event originated a long process whereby three nations (France, Italy and the Principality of Monaco), with the intervening support of several environmental NGOs in France and Italy, were able to finally agree on an international treaty signed in Rome on 25 November 1999.

Tethys was also the first proponent of a Dolphin Reserve off the island of Lošinj (Croatia), which however no longer exists. Having been established by Croatia in 2006, the reserve was met with such a strong opposition by local stakeholders that its confirmation was torpedoed in 2009.

Tethys is also contributing to the conservation of the Endangered Mediterranean monk seal (Monachus monachus). Having catalysed the support to the plight of the Mediterranean pinniped by the Prince Albert II of Monaco Foundation, Tethys joined efforts with WWF Greece in a long-term project, CYCLADES LIFE+, co-financed by the European Commission, the Prince Albert II of Monaco Foundation, the BlueMarine Foundation, and the Ensemble Foundation. The project envisages the involvement of the local communities of the islands of Syros and Andros (Greece) in the co-management and participation in the protection of the local marine biodiversity, particularly on and around the uninhabited island of Gyaros. This island hosts the Mediterranean's largest surviving colony of monk seals, as well as important colonies of threatened marine birds. Tethys' expertise has also contributed to the formulation of a national strategy and action plan for the conservation of the Mediterranean monk seal in Greece, and to the Regional Strategy for the conservation of monk seals in the Mediterranean, adopted by the Contracting Parties to the Barcelona Convention during their 18th Ordinary Meeting in Istanbul in 2013.

Tethys is currently leading the development of the concept of Important Marine Mammal Areas (IMMAs), in cooperation with the IUCN Marine Mammals Protected Areas Task Force (MMPA TF) and Whale and Dolphin Conservation. Defined as discrete portions of habitat important to marine mammal species or populations, IMMAs have the potential to be delineated and managed for conservation. IMMAs consist of areas that may merit place-based protection and/or monitoring and are identified on a region-by-region basis. The First Mediterranean Region Important Marine Mammal Areas IMMA Workshop, held in Chania, Crete (Greece), 24–28 October 2016, was organised by Tethys in cooperation with ACCOBAMS. Eight more regions have been assessed for the presence of IMMAs since 2017, encompassing the Indian Ocean, the South Pacific Ocean, the Southern Ocean and the Southwestern Atlantic, in addition to the Black and Caspian Seas.

== Public awareness and education actions ==
A fundamental aspect of Tethys' contribution to marine conservation is public awareness, achieved through the institute's presence on social media and public television, articles, lectures, conferences, shows, and museum installations. Tethys has been involving thousands of people from across the world in its citizen science programmes through its long-term projects. CSR and IDP are among the world's longest standing programmes of citizen science.

Other communication initiatives were:

- "Digital Whales" (September 2019 – December 2020), an augmented-reality project at the Civic Aquarium of Milan, launched together with Verdeacqua, and funded by Fondazione Cariplo. During the Covid pandemic the exhibit was available online.
- "Cetacei Fai Attenzione" ("Be aware of cetaceans", 2018–2020), a public awareness and citizen science project mainly sponsored by FAI Fondo Ambiente Italiano (Italian Fund for the Environment), with the collaboration of the Italian Coast Guard. Sightings of Mediterranean species were collected from owners of pleasure boats, whale watching platforms, and several organisations. Posters and leaflets presenting a code of conduct when approaching cetaceans were distributed.
- "Missione Pelagos", an educational project centered around the Pelagos Sanctuary with a focus on its whales and dolphins, aimed at the dissemination of science and conservation among kids of elementary and middle schools. The use of the website is proposed to Italian municipalities that joined the Partnership Charter of the Pelagos Sanctuary. Missione Pelagos was supported by the Soroptimists Club of Italy.
- "Marine Ecomed" (MARINE Education and COmmunication network on the MEDiterranean (2018–2021), a project created through the support of the Erasmus+ EU Program, in collaboration with IUAV University of Venice, Aix Marseille University, University of Thessaloniki, Submon and iSea. The objective was to build an international strategic partnership to enhance research and education in the subject of sustainable marine management and communication strategies, within the Mediterranean unique natural and socio-economic context. The educational materials included a MOOC on Planning and management of marine and coastal areas and Ocean literacy, and a Handbook on Marine education and communication in the Mediterranean.
- Tethys was also involved as a participant in a project named "Thalassa Campaign: Learn, Act, Protect - Awareness, Educational and Participation Campaign for Marine Mammals in Greece", financed by the European Commission. The project (2010–2013) integrated public awareness, environmental education campaigns and numerous participatory actions in order to engage the Greek public in an effort to actively protect marine mammals and their natural environment in Greek waters.

== Organisation structure ==
The formal structure of the Tethys Research Institute is that of an association incorporated within the Italian law. The main governing body is the Assembly of Members, which elects the board of directors and the President. The work of Tethys is based on the collaboration of approximately 30 members and tens of assistants. Tethys' funding derives from government grants, private donors, national and European Commission programmes, and from citizen science programmes.

== Sources ==
- Tethys Research Institute's website
- Tethys' citizen science projects website
- Tethys' blog
- Tethys' FaceBook page
- Tethys' Instagram page
- Ionian Dolphin Project website
