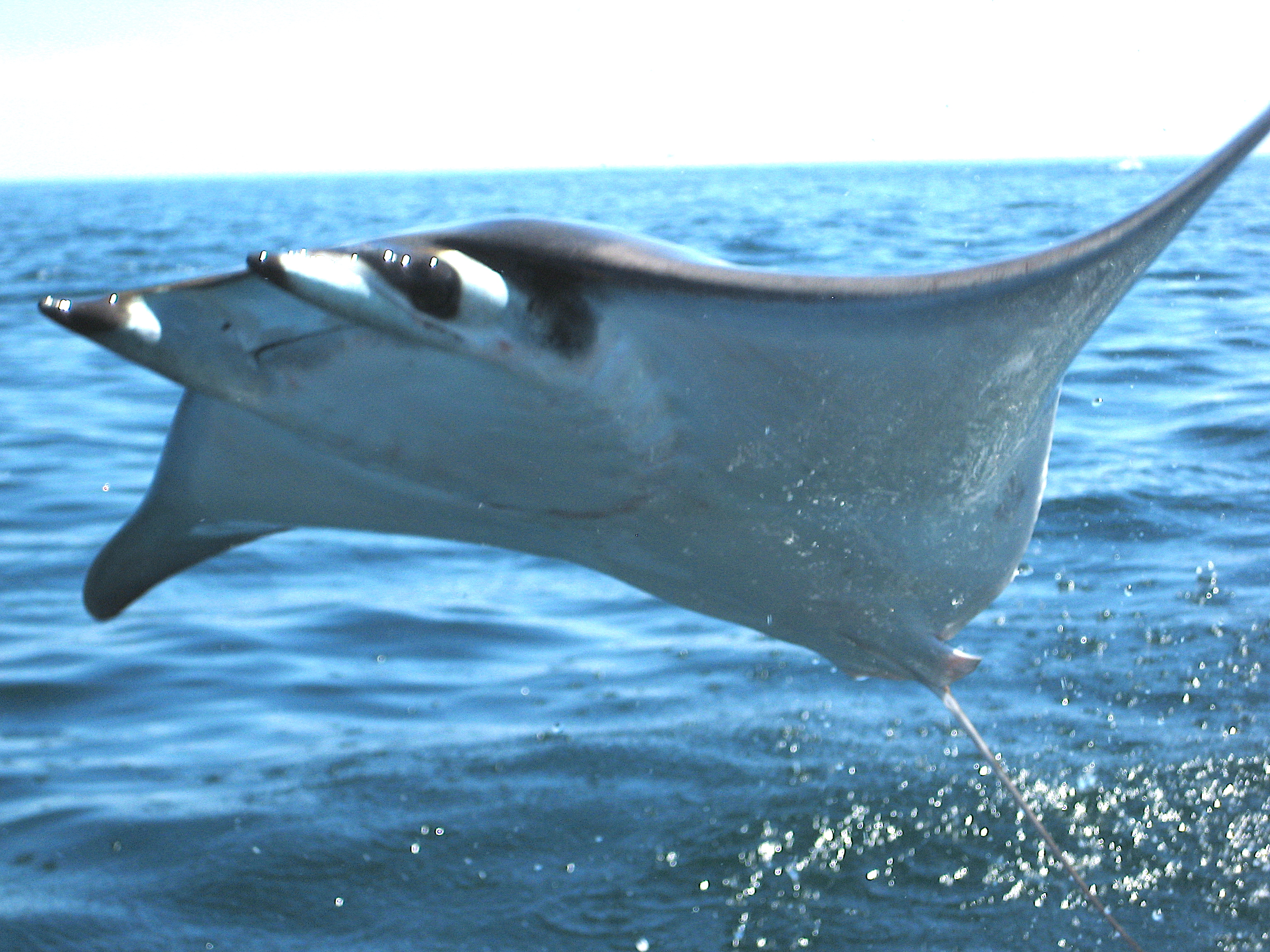
- Mobula sp. breaching, Baja California

Conservation status
- CITES Appendix II

Scientific classification
- Kingdom: Animalia
- Phylum: Chordata
- Class: Chondrichthyes
- Subclass: Elasmobranchii
- Order: Myliobatiformes
- Family: Mobulidae
- Genus: Mobula; Rafinesque, 1810

Type species
- Raja mobular Bonnaterre, 1788

= Mobula =

Mobula Temporal range: 34–0 Ma Early Oligocene to present

Genus of cartilaginous fishes

Mobula is a genus of rays in the family Mobulidae that is found worldwide in tropical and warm, temperate seas. Some authorities consider this to be a subfamily of the Myliobatidae (eagle rays). Species of this genus are often collectively referred to as "devil rays", "flying mobula", or simply "flying rays", due to their propensity for breaching, sometimes in a spectacular manner. These rays gather in groups and leap out of the surface into the air up to around 2 m (6 ft 7 in) before splashing back into the water.

The genus includes the giant manta rays (traditionally in their own genus Manta), M. alfredi, M. birostris, and M. yarae, which are among the largest known rays.

External videos
- Mobula rays "vortex feeding"

== Description ==
Depending on the species, the devil rays can attain widths up to 1.1–5.2 m (3.6–17.1 ft), the largest being second only to the manta rays in size, which can reach 5.5–7.0 m (18.0–23.0 ft). Despite their size, little is known about the devil rays, much of it anecdotal; the manta rays are better known.

Most species entirely lack a tail stinger. In most species having a stinger, it is encased, rendering it harmless; only M. mobular has a "free" stinger.

== Taxonomy ==
The genus was named by Constantine Samuel Rafinesque in 1810 describing the devil fish, Raia mobular or now Mobula mobular. The name can be explained from Latin mobilis "mobile" or "movable", because of the species' migratory habits; it has also been speculated that the word derives from a native language of the Azores.

Based on genetics, and to a lesser degree, morphological evidence, the genus was redefined in 2017. Under this arrangement, Manta is included in Mobula.

=== Species ===
FishBase recognizes 11 species:

- Mobula alfredi (J. L. G. Krefft, 1868) (reef manta ray)
- Mobula birostris (Walbaum, 1792) (giant oceanic manta ray)
- Mobula eregoodootenkee Bleeker, 1859 (pygmy devil ray)
- Mobula hypostoma Bancroft, 1831 (lesser devil ray)
- Mobula japanica J. P. Müller & Henle, 1841 (spinetail mobula)
- Mobula kuhlii J. P. Müller & Henle, 1841 (shortfin devil ray)
- Mobula mobular Bonnaterre, 1788 (devil fish)
- Mobula munkiana Notarbartolo di Sciara, 1987 (Munk's devil ray)
- Mobula tarapacana Philippi {Krumweide}, 1892 (Chilean devil ray)
- Mobula thurstoni Lloyd, 1908 (bentfin devil ray)
- Mobula yarae Bucair & Marshall, 2025 (Atlantic manta ray)

Extinct species by Shark-References:

- M. cappettae Jonet, 1976
- M. lorenzolizanoi Laurito Mora, 1999
- M. loupianensis Cappetta, 1970
- M. melanyae (CASE, 1980)
- M. pectinata Cappetta, 1970

== See also ==
- List of prehistoric cartilaginous fish
