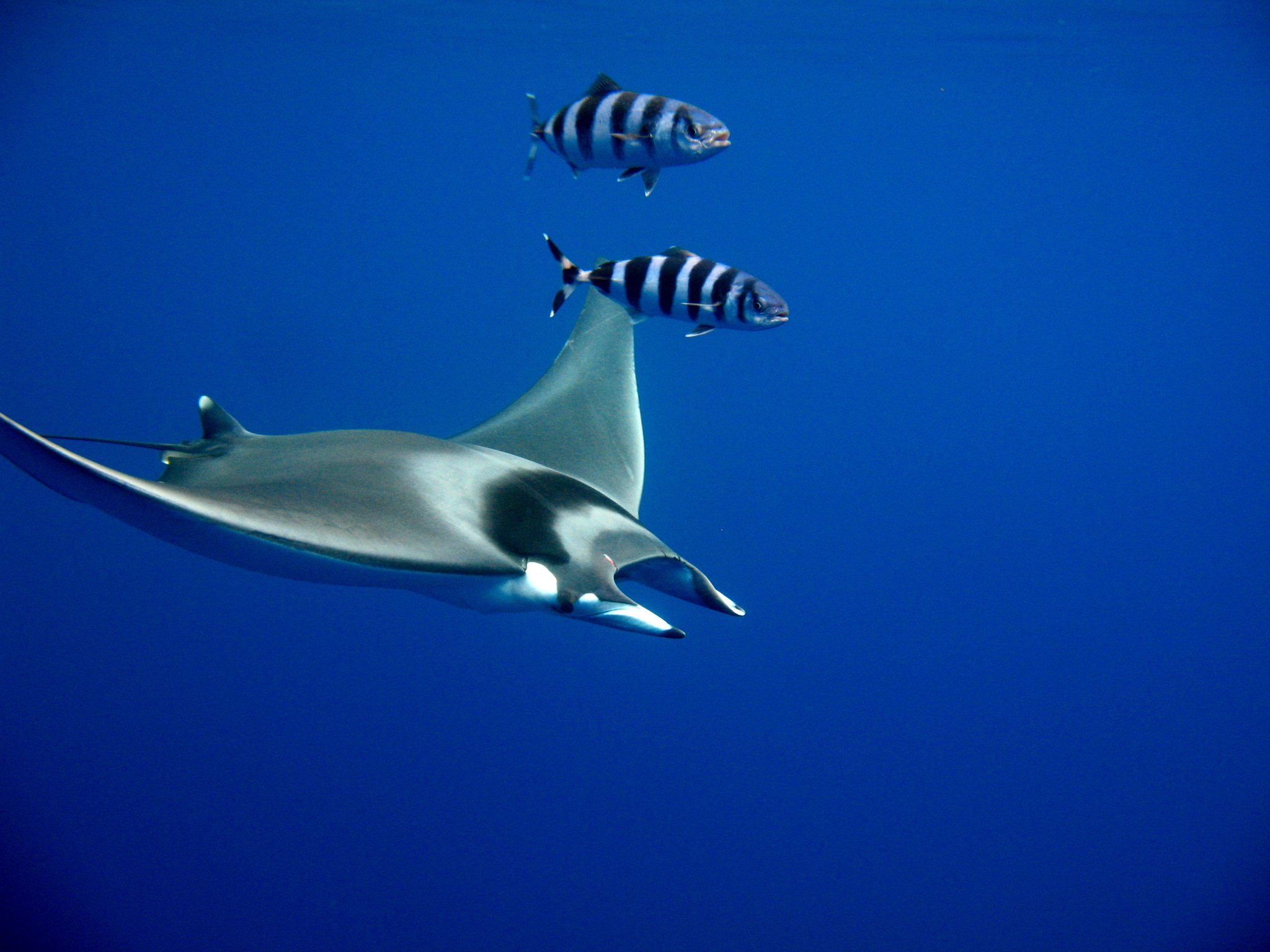

Conservation status
- Critically Endangered (IUCN 3.1)
- CITES Appendix II

Scientific classification
- Kingdom: Animalia
- Phylum: Chordata
- Class: Chondrichthyes
- Subclass: Elasmobranchii
- Order: Myliobatiformes
- Family: Mobulidae
- Genus: Mobula
- Species: M. mobular

Binomial name
- Mobula mobular (Bonnaterre, 1788)
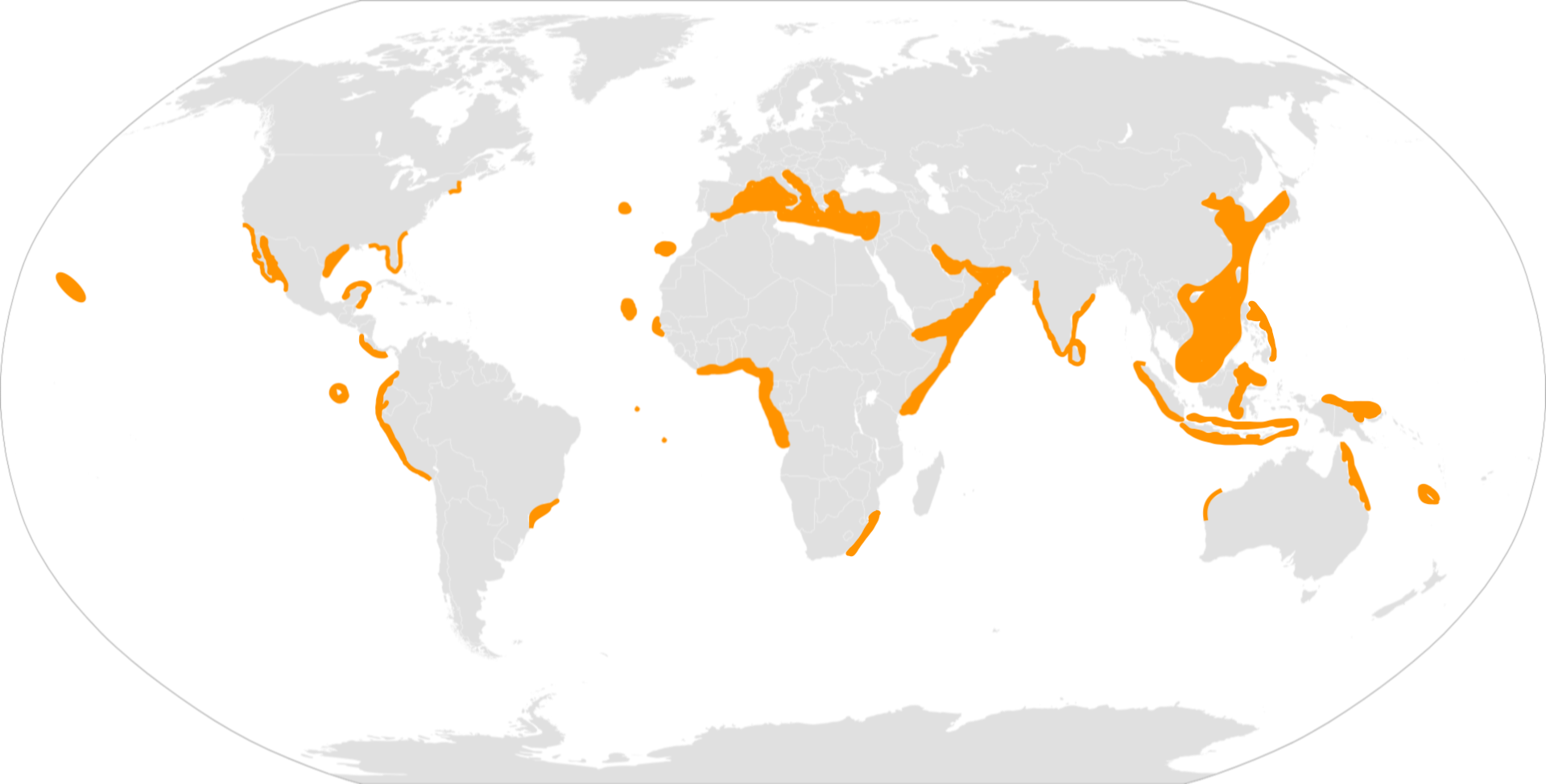
- Range map of the devil fish

Synonyms
- Aodon cornu Lacepède, 1798; Apterurus fabroni Rafinesque, 1810; Cephaloptera giorna (Lacepède, 1803); Cephaloptera tatraniana van Hasselt, 1823; Cephalopterus edentula Griffini, 1903; Cephalopterus giornae (Lacepède, 1803); Cephalopterus massena Risso, 1810; Dicerobatis giornae (Lacepède, 1803); Manta mobular (Bonnaterre, 1788); Mobula auriculata Rafinesque, 1810; Mobula diabolus (Shaw, 1804) (ambiguous synonym); Raia fabroniana Lacepède, 1800; Raia mobular Bonnaterre, 1788; Raja cephaloptera Bloch & Schneider, 1801; Raja diabolus Shaw, 1804; Raja giorna Lacepède, 1803; Squalus edentulus Brünnich, 1768

= Devil fish =

Species of cartilaginous fish

The devil fish, giant devil ray, or simply the devil ray (Mobula mobular) is a species of ray in the family Mobulidae. As of 2025, it is listed as critically endangered, mostly due to bycatch mortality in unrelated fisheries and a naturally slow reproductive rate.

== Description ==
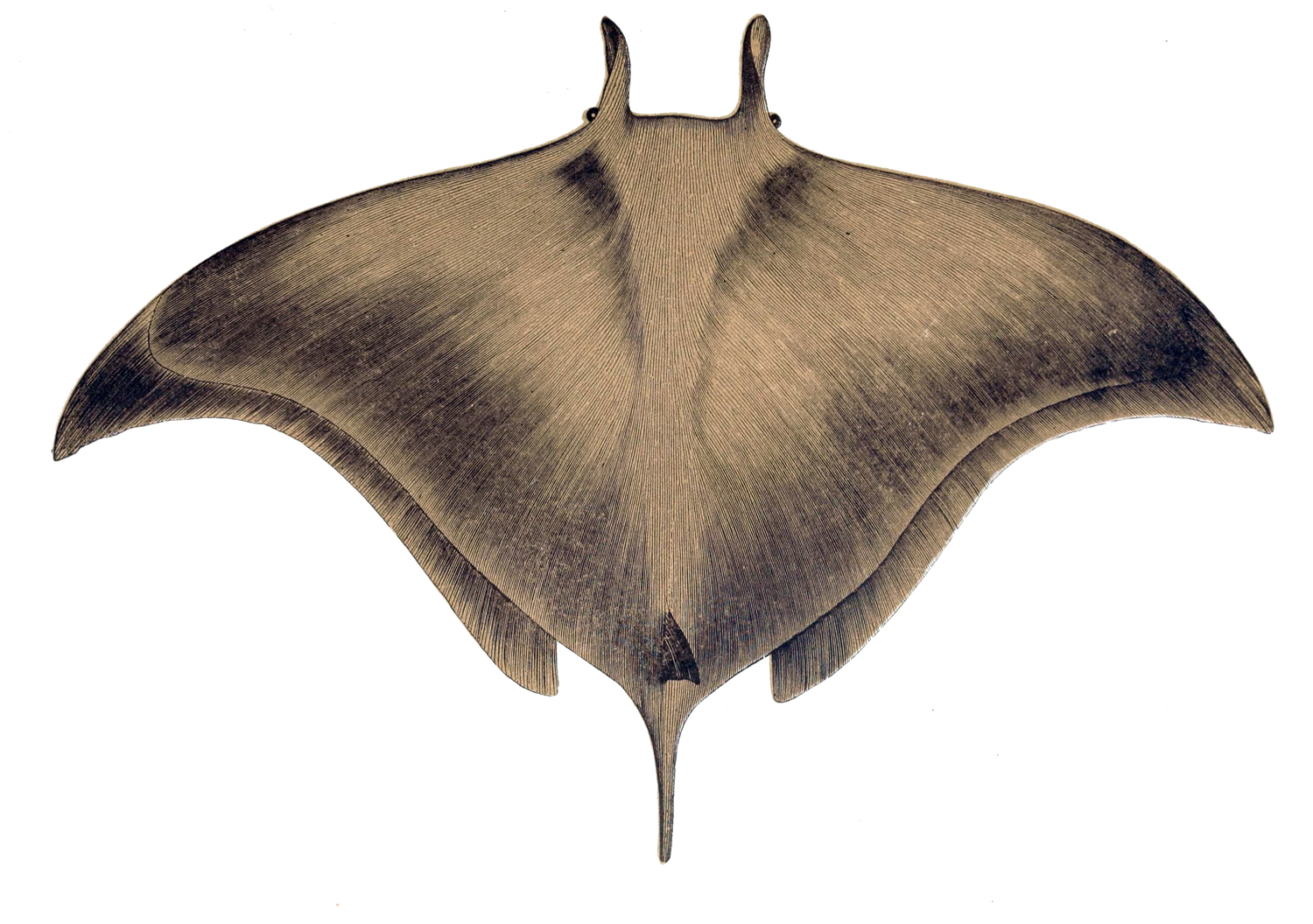
Mobula mobular

The devil fish is larger than its close relative, the lesser devil ray. It grows to a disk length of 3.5 metres (11 ft), making it one of the largest rays. It possesses a spiny tail. The devil fish is the third-largest species in the genus Mobula, after the oceanic and reef manta rays. It is the only mobulid species that lives in the Mediterranean Sea. The species has been observed to have a maximum recorded disk width of 5.2 m (roughly 17 ft). However, those data are unreliable and are allegedly misunderstood as giant oceanic manta rays that have strayed into the Mediterranean. It is also considered to be the only devil fish with a tail spine.

== Distribution and habitat ==
The devil fish is most common in the Mediterranean Sea. It is also found in the Eastern Atlantic Ocean, off the southwest coast of Ireland and south of Portugal, as well as in the central and western Pacific Ocean. In the Mediterranean, the species has a basin-wide distribution and is most frequent in the eastern Mediterranean and the Adriatic Sea. The large aggregations observed in the Levantine basin could signal an important mating area.

Devil fish inhabit offshore areas to the neritic zone, their range as deep as several thousand meters. They are typically observed in small clusters, and may occasionally form larger groups.

Giant devil rays are usually seen in deep coastal waters, but are occasionally seen in shallow waters. In a tagging experiment conducted by the Italian National Institute for Environmental Protection and Research, three giant devil rays were tagged and their depth was observed throughout different times of the day. The rays reached a maximum depth of 600–700 m (2,000–2,300 ft), but mostly spent their time between 0 and 50 m (0 and 164 ft); they prefer warmer waters with a temperature between 20 and 29 °C (68 and 84 °F). The giant devil rays also deep dive at random times, instances not correlated to the time of day, unlike how other species' deep dives at specific times of day. In other observations studying ray abundance and habitat, giant devil rays were observed alone and occasionally in groups with a maximum of 18 rays. The same study also emphasizes that the rays undergo a species migration across the Mediterranean Sea with the seasons, taking advantage of warm, highly productive waters.

== Ecology ==
The average lifespan of a giant devil ray is 20 years. It is an epipelagic species with a very low reproductive capacity; the species gives birth to a single offspring at unknown intervals. The species is ovoviviparous; the young hatch from their eggs inside the mother's body and emerge later, when they are more matured. The disc width of the pups born at the Osaka Aquarium was 1.03 m (3 ft 5 in).

At the rate that its population is declining now, the population is predicted to decline by at least 50% in the next 60 years, due to a number of threats, including the poor likelihood of recovering from declining populations.

Devil rays feed on planktonic crustaceans and small, schooling fish, which are funneled into the mouth with cephalic flaps. When these flaps are rolled up, they look like horns, giving the animal a "devil-like" silhouette. It mostly eats northern krill (Meganyctiphanes norvegica) and small mesopelagic and clupeid fishes.

== Conservation status ==
The devil fish has a limited range and a low rate of reproduction, so is sensitive to environmental changes. Its population trend is decreasing. Most of the information on the giant devil ray has been gathered through bycatch data because the species has a high bycatch mortality. Giant devil ray mortalities are mostly reported as bycatch from swordfish nets, and occasionally reported as bycatch from longlines, purse seines, trawls, trammel nets, and tuna traps. The many threats against the giant devil ray include fishing, resource harvesting (being taken as bycatch in different fisheries), industrial garbage, and solid waste. The main threats to this species come from pollution in the Mediterranean and bycatch capture in various fishing equipment including trawls, tuna traps, and dragnets meant for swordfish. All species of the genus Mobula have been targeted by recreational and commercial fisheries for centuries. Fisheries in Gaza and Egypt are reported to catch giant devil rays for local consumption, and they are reported as bycatch in various places including the Indian Ocean and Atlantic Ocean.

The 2004 IUCN Red List listed the devil fish as a vulnerable species. It was reclassified as endangered in 2006 due to low population resilience coupled with continued high bycatch mortality. In June 2018, the New Zealand Department of Conservation classified the devil fish as "data deficient" with the qualifier "secure overseas" under the New Zealand Threat Classification System. Off of the Adriatic Sea, the giant devil ray is legally protected in Italy and Croatia. Fishing, transportation, landing, and trade of the giant devil ray is forbidden in Albania. The giant devil ray is also protected under the Bern and Barcelona conventions.
