= Emanuele Notarbartolo =

Italian politician

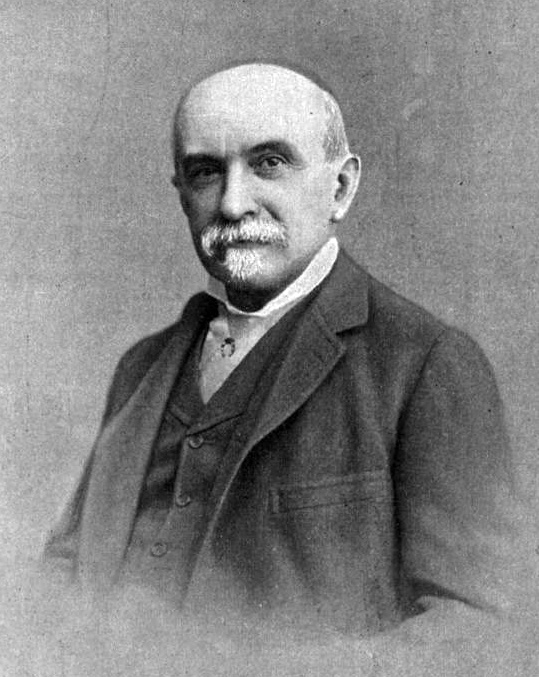
Emanuele Notarbartolo

Emanuele Notarbartolo, Marquis of San Giovanni (Italian pronunciation: [emanuˈɛːle notarˈbartolo]; Palermo, 23 February 1834 – Termini Imerese, 1 February 1893) was an Italian banker and politician. He is widely considered as the Sicilian Mafia's first eminent victim in 1893.

Of aristocratic origins – Notarbartolo being one of the most prominent families of Sicilian nobility and his grandfather being Francesco Paolo, Prince of Sciara – he took part in Giuseppe Garibaldi's Expedition of the Thousand and became a distinguished member of the Historical Right. He served as the mayor of Palermo and as Director General of Banco di Sicilia (Bank of Sicily). The integrity he demonstrated in his public offices, in particular at the Banco di Sicilia, ultimately cost him his life.

On 1 February 1893, on the train from Termini Imerese to Trabia, he was stabbed 27 times by Matteo Filippello and Giuseppe Fontana, two affiliates of cosa nostra.

In 1899, the Chamber of Deputies authorized the trial against politician Raffaele Palizzolo it as the instigator of the assassination. In 1902, he was found guilty and sentenced to 30 years in prison, but the Supreme Court of Cassation annulled the sentence, and in the new trial which was held in July 1904, he was acquitted by the Court in Florence due to insufficient evidence.

One of the main streets of Palermo is dedicated to him, as well as the Notarbartolo Railway Station.
