= Notarbartolo =

Aristocratic family of the Sicilian nobility

- Noble family
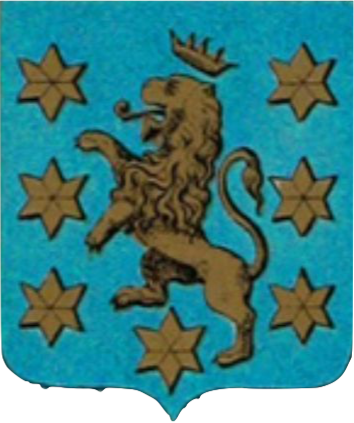
- Motto: "Ne cede malis"
- Country: Italy
- Founded: 10th century
- Founder: Bartolo of Andernach
- Cadet branches: Notarbartolo della Golfa (ext.); Notarbartolo di Villanova (ext.); Notarbartolo di Sicchechi (ext.); Notarbartolo di Sciara; Notarbartolo di Villarosa; Notarbartolo di Furnari

Notarbartolo is one of the main aristocratic families of the Sicilian nobility. Originated in the Middle Ages, it gave to the island numerous personalities who have made a significant contribution to its social, political, intellectual and artistic life. The different branches of the family collected, over the centuries, numerous fiefdoms and noble titles.

== History ==
The name of the family derives from Bartolo of Andernach, a descendant of Gerlach of the House of Wangenii of Château de Wangenbourg, since the 5th century lords of "Andermacco in Alsace" (Andernach, castle on the Rhine). Bartolo descended into Italy in 951 a.D. as "signifer" (assistant) of the Holy Roman Emperor Otto I. Returning to Germany to face the threat of the Magyars - which he defeated at the Battle of Lechfeld in 955 - the Emperor appointed Bartolo as governor ("gubernator") of Pisa. At his death, Bartolo was succeeded by his son Lucchino, called by the local population Lucchin di Noterbartolo, "Lucchino (son) of Notarius Bartolo". His descendants lived in Pisa, Siena, Perugia and other cities of medieval Italy, where they were known as knights and men of letters, intermarrying with numerous illustrious families.

As a consequence of the war between the Guelphs and Ghibellines, a descendant belonging to the latter faction, Pietro Notarbartolo Farfaglia, moved in the late 13th century to Catania. Pietro, Royal Secretary of Aragonese King Frederick III of Sicily, obtained by the latter in feudum the control of the city of Polizzi.

In Sicily, the family flourished - at first in Polizzi and, later on, especially in Palermo - gaining numerous fiefdoms and titles and later subdividing in the 16th century in the two main branches of the Princes of Sciara and of the Dukes of Villarosa. Members of both the branches, as well as of the branch of the Princes of Furnari, were Peers of the Realm.

Throughout the centuries, the House of Notarbartolo established tight familiar and economic relationships with many of the most influential Italian families. Just to mention a few, the family intermarried with the Houses of Alliata, Filangeri, Gravina, Grimaldi, Lancia, Moncada, Obizzi, Paternò, Piccolomini, Spucches, Stagno, Tomasi di Lampedusa, Valguarnera, Ventimiglia.

A distinguished representative of the family was the Marquis Emanuele Notarbartolo (1834 - 1893), mayor of Palermo and Director General of the Banco di Sicilia, widely considered as Mafia's first eminent victim in 1893. One of the most important streets of Palermo is dedicated to him, as well as the Notarbartolo Railway Station.

The branch of the Princes of Sciara had as family residence in Palermo the palace of la Zisa, later expropriated by the Italian state in 1955 and appointed World Heritage Site (UNESCO) in July 2015.

Both the main branches of the family of the Princes of Sciara and of the Dukes of Villarosa are still proceeding nowadays.

== Prominent members ==
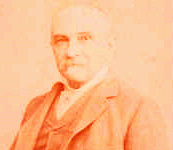
Emanuele Notarbartolo, Marchese di San Giovanni, first eminent victim of the Mafia.

- Bartolo (d. 979), Secretary of Holy Roman Emperor Otto I, governor of Pisa
- Frederico, priest (d. 1218), was Prince-Bishop of Trento from August 9, 1207 until his death.
- Guido Notarbartolo (d. 1269), commander of the Ghibellines of Florence
- Ludovico Notarbartolo (d. 1320), Ghibelline commander, Admiral of the King of Naples Robert of Anjou
- Pietro Notarbartolo (1270 - 1335), Royal Secretary of Frederick III of Sicily and governor of Polizzi
- Giovanni Notarbartolo (d. 1437), Bishop of Patti
- Ugo Notarbartolo (d. 1615), knight of the SMOM, governor of Palermo's Monte di Pietà, senator
- Francesco Paolo Notarbartolo (1777 - 1823), 4th Prince of Sciara, representing Ferdinand I, King of the Two Sicilies, at the Congress of Vienna
- Emanuele Notarbartolo (1834 - 1893), mayor of Palermo and Director General of the Banco di Sicilia, Mafia's first eminent victim in 1893
- Marco Notarbartolo di Sciara (1902 - 1985), navy officer, aide-de-camp of Victor Emmanuel III of Italy and founder of Centro Velico Caprera
- Giuseppe Notarbartolo di Sciara (b. 1948), marine biologist and conservationist

== Coat of arms ==
The emblem of the family was confirmed to admiral Ludovico Notarbartolo by King Robert of Anjou with act dated 14 July 1314. The coat of arms depicts a golden prancing lion on a blue background, crowned and surrounded by seven stars, representing the seven naval victories that members of the Notarbartolo family contributed to obtain during the war against the Ghibellines.

== Sources ==
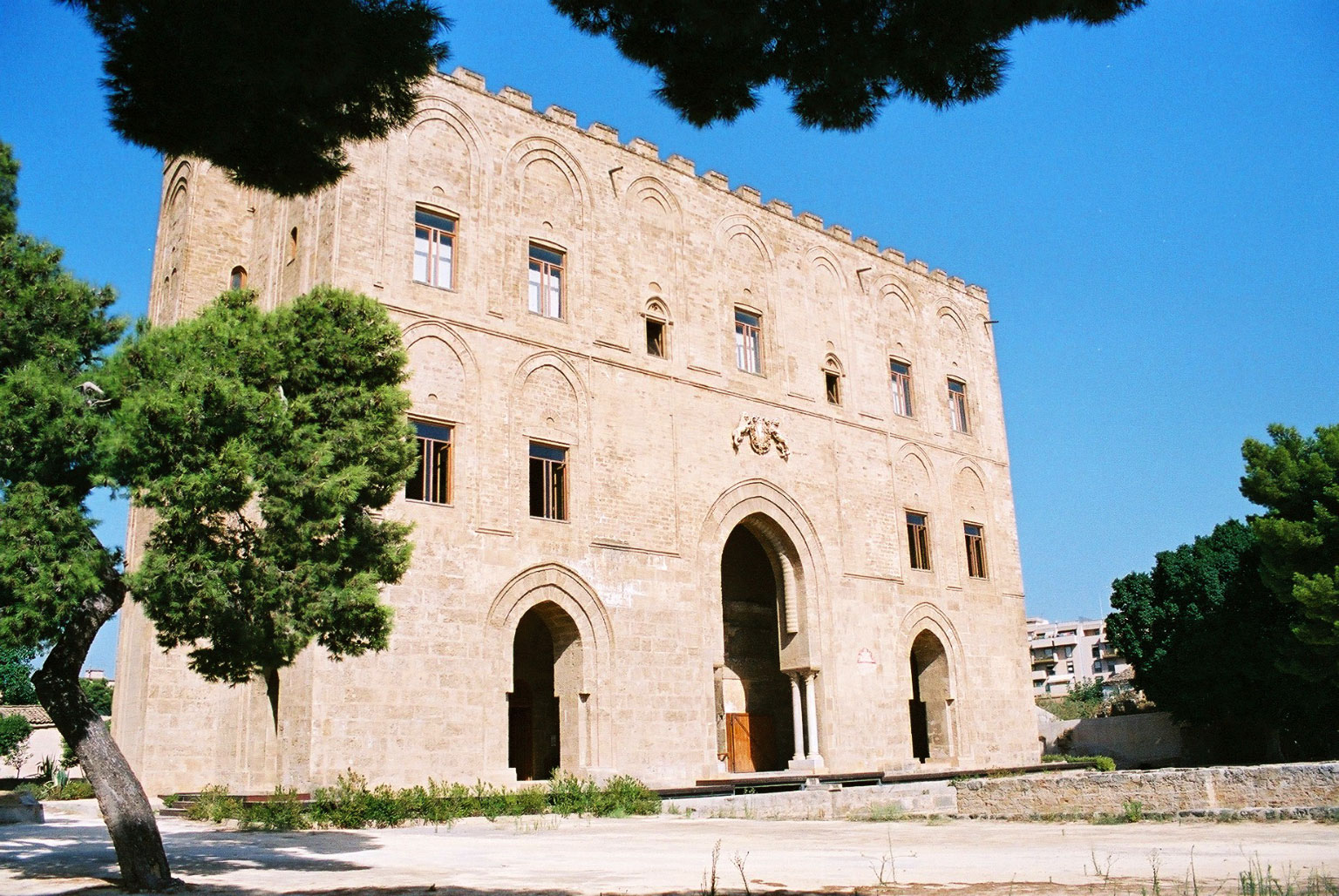
La Zisa castle, once residence of the Prince of Sciara in Palermo

- A. Mango di Casalgerardo, Il nobiliario di Sicilia, Palermo, 1915 (it.)
- F. San Martino de Spucches, La storia dei feudi e dei titoli nobiliari di Sicilia, Palermo, 1924 (it.)
- M. Ganci, I grandi titoli del Regno di Sicilia, Palermo - Syracuse, 1988 (it.)
- V. Palizzolo Gravina, Dizionario storico-araldico della Sicilia, II. Ed., Palermo, 1991 (it.)
- A. Bisceglia, Signori, patrizi e cavalieri nell'età moderna, Laterza, Rome - Bari, 1992 (it.)
- L. Mendola, Sicilian Genealogy and Heraldry, Trinacria Editions LLC, New York, 2014.
- M. Papalia, La Casa Notarbartolo - Storie e Tavole Genealogiche, Antipodes, Palermo, 2016 (it.)
