= Giuseppe Notarbartolo di Sciara =

Italian marine conservation ecologist (born 1948)

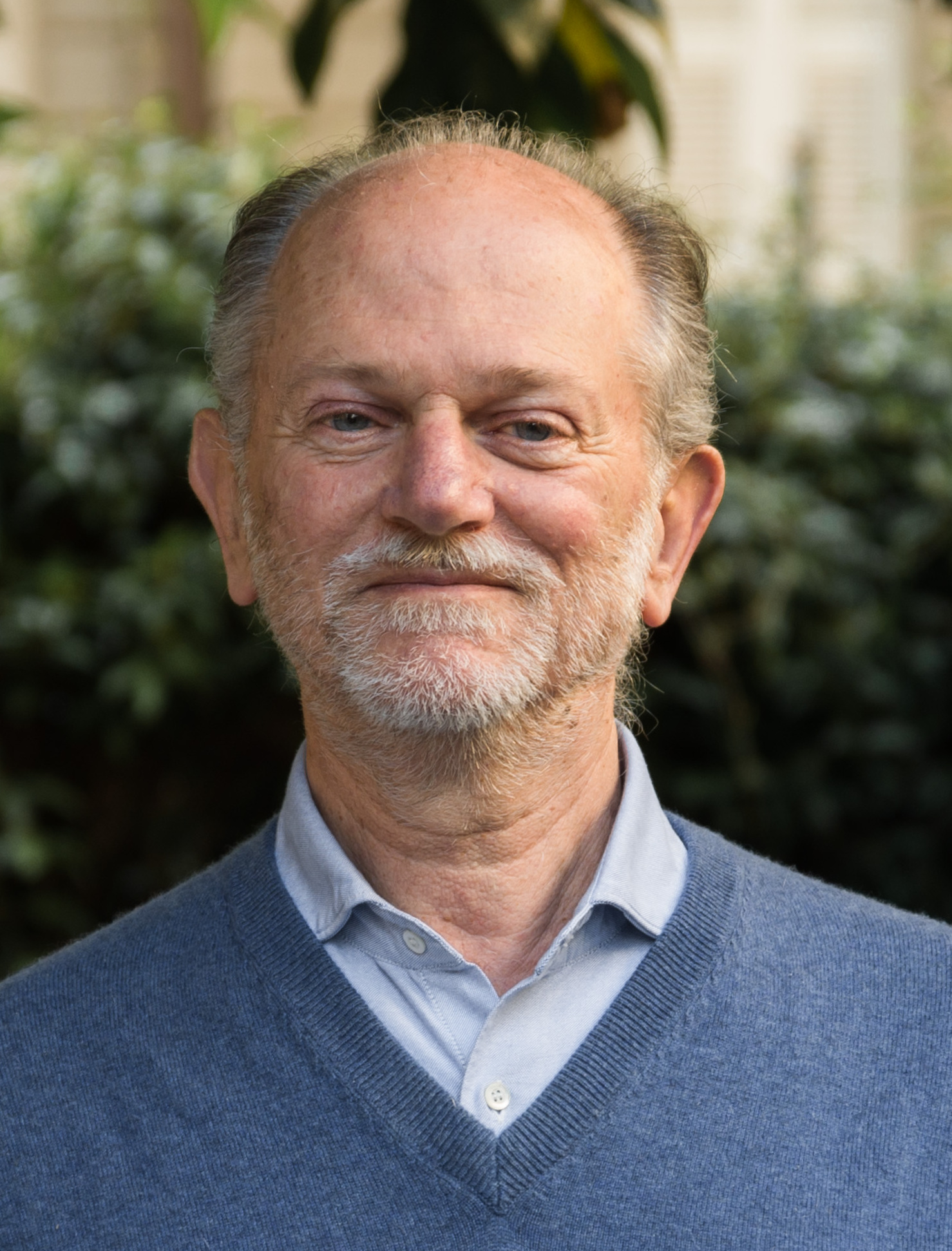
- Giuseppe Notarbartolo di Sciara in 2018, ECS Conference, La Spezia
- Born: November 27, 1948 (age 77); Venice
- Education: University of Parma
- Alma mater: Scripps Institution of Oceanography, University of California, San Diego
- Known for: Bridged the worlds of marine science, conservation and policy
- Partner: Flavia Pizzi
- Children: Marco and Bianca
- Scientific career
- Fields: Marine ecology and conservation
- Institutions: Tethys Research Institute
- Thesis: A revisionary study of the genus Mobula Rafinesque, 1810 (Chondrichthyes, Mobulidae), with the description of a new species (1987)

Giuseppe Notarbartolo di Sciara (born November 27, 1948) is an Italian marine conservation ecologist who has bridged the worlds of marine science, conservation and policy.

== Education and early career ==
Giuseppe Notarbartolo di Sciara's interest in marine life grew out of a lifelong love of the sea. His ancestors were mariners and his father was a founder of the Centro Velico Caprera, which honed Giuseppe's interest in Italy's marine environs and focused his childhood fascination with animals towards protecting marine life.

Notarbartolo di Sciara was born in 1948 in Venice and belongs to the ancient Sicilian family Notarbartolo. He obtained laurea degrees in biological sciences (1974) and in natural sciences (1976) at the University of Parma, Italy. Opportunities for research on marine mammals in Italy were non-existent in the 1970s, however, so when he finished his studies at University of Parma, working on gobies and diving rats, he traveled to the U.S. where he resided until the 1985. At Hubbs-Sea World Research Institute in San Diego, California, he worked on beluga whales and whale sharks, as well as doing research with humpback whales in Hawaii and Bryde's whales in Venezuela. He later enrolled as a student at the Scripps Institution of Oceanography, University of California, San Diego, where he obtained a Ph.D. (1985) in marine biology with a thesis on manta ray taxonomy and ecology in the Gulf of California. There he discovered and described a new manta ray species, Mobula munkiana, which he named after his mentor, the esteemed oceanographer Walter Munk. In 1985 Notarbartolo di Sciara moved back to his home country where he started working on Mediterranean and Red Sea conservations issues. In Italy he married Flavia Pizzi. They have two children, Marco and Bianca.

== Research ==
Notarbartolo di Sciara has been concerned for over 40 years with the advancement of knowledge of the natural history, ecology, behaviour, taxonomy and conservation of aquatic vertebrates, with an emphasis on whales, dolphins, seals, sharks and manta rays, and has described his research in about 260 scientific works and books, and many reports and conference presentations. While investigating manta ray taxonomy and ecology in the Gulf of California (Mexico), the research vessel on which he was living and navigating caught fire and sunk, however he continued his work after basing himself on land. Back in Milano, Italy, Notarbartolo di Sciara continued influencing marine research through his involvement with the Tethys Research Institute, a private non-profit organisation specialising in the study and conservation of Mediterranean large marine vertebrates. Under his guidance the Tethys Research Institute was steered towards a suite of research activities to provide knowledge on Mediterranean marine mammals ecology essential for the implementation of conservation measures.

== Conservation policy, science and management ==
In 1986 Notarbartolo di Sciara recognised the need for an institution targeting Mediterranean marine species at risk, and founded in response the Tethys Research Institute, specialising in the study and conservation of Mediterranean marine mammals. Today Tethys is a research NGO, producing numerous scientific publications each year and supporting the work of many dozens of graduate students in marine biology.

A decade later, Notarbartolo di Sciara was nominated by the President of Italy to lead the Central Institute for Applied Marine Research (ICRAM, later merged into ISPRA). His 7-year term as President of ICRAM guided that institution in a more strategic direction and allowed the creation and flourishing of many important conservation and planning initiatives, including the strengthening of marine protected area design, coordinated research within MPA sites, and applied science for conservation problem-solving. Notarbartolo di Sciara has also exhibited conservation leadership by serving as the President of the European Cetacean Society (1993–1997).

Today Notarbartolo di Sciara is well known throughout Europe as a conservation leader and television personality. He was a regular guest of "L’Arca di Noè", a series on wildlife of the world, and of Geo & Geo, a live show televised daily throughout Italy.

== Marine Protected Areas (MPAs) ==
While at Tethys, Notarbartolo di Sciara proposed in 1991 the creation of a large protected area for cetaceans in the north-western Mediterranean, which later became the Pelagos Sanctuary for Mediterranean Marine Mammals, established by treaty between France, Italy and Monaco. His return to Italy from the U.S. allowed fateful encounters with many of the other champions for marine conservation who would become so instrumental in making the international Pelagos Sanctuary a reality, including Prince Ranier III of Monaco. Key was his membership in and subsequent coordination role in the marine mammal working group of CIESM (the International Commission for the Scientific Exploration of the Mediterranean Sea). Also critically important was his leadership and support of Tethys, since the Mediterranean cetaceans that are the focus of the NGO also provided the impetus for the establishment of the Pelagos Sanctuary. His involvement with Pelagos Sanctuary continues to this day.

As president of ICRAM he spearheaded the promotion of Italy's marine protected area system, based on solid science and monitoring practice. In particular, his efforts were instrumental in the launching of project "Afrodite", whereby the core zones of 15 Italian MPAs were monitored on the basis of standard protocols (e.g.,). Notarbartolo di Sciara has also often worked as a consultant to organisations involved in the conservation and management of the Mediterranean, including the Regional Activity Centre for Specially Protected Areas (RAC/SPA) of UNEP's Mediterranean Action Plan, and MedPAN.

Notarbartolo di Sciara has also been heavily involved with the conservation of the Red Sea. In particular, he has been a science advisor to HEPCA, the Hurghada Environmental Protection and Conservation Association – the main marine conservation NGO in Egypt. He was also instrumental in creating the highly touted management plan for Samadai MPA, which allowed tourism to co-exist with conservation of spinner dolphins and coral reefs. In 2017 with several colleagues he published a detailed review of cetaceans found in the Red Sea.

In 2013, with Erich Hoyt, he founded the IUCN Joint SSC/WCPA Marine Mammal Protected Areas Task Force (MMPATF). The Task Force launched in 2016 a programme to identify Important Marine Mammal Areas (IMMAs) in the world's oceans, seas and inland waters, to support marine mammal and biodiversity conservation.

== Protected species ==
While the president of ICRAM, Notarbartolo di Sciara served for several years as Commissioner for Italy at the International Whaling Commission, and contributed to the establishment of a national policy on whaling issues and on the promotion of a conservation agenda within the IWC, in cooperation with other like-minded nations.

In 2002 the Agreement on the Conservation of Cetaceans of the Black Sea, Mediterranean Sea and Contiguous Atlantic Area ACCOBAMS came into force, and Notarbartolo di Sciara served as the chair of the Agreement's Scientific Committee from the beginning until 2010. Notarbartolo di Sciara has served as Deputy Chair of the Cetacean Specialist Group of the International Union for the Conservation of Nature (IUCN) since 1991, and as member of the Shark Specialist Group since 1993. Notarbartolo di Sciara has been engaged in monk seal conservation science since 1986, first conducting a feasibility study for a monk seal captive-breeding a rehabilitation facility in Italy on behalf of the Ministry of Agriculture and Forestry. In 2009 he was contracted by the Hellenic Society for the Study and Protection of the Mediterranean Monk Seal (MOm) to draft the national conservation strategy for monk seals in Greece, and has drafted two successive editions (in 2014 and 2019) of the Regional Strategy for the Conservation of Monk Seals in the Mediterranean, both adopted by the Parties to the Barcelona Convention.

Notarbartolo di Sciara serves today in the Scientific Council of the Convention on the Conservation of Migratory Species of Wild Animals as the Councillor for aquatic mammals. He was appointed in such capacity in 2014 by the Conference of the Parties.

== Teaching ==
From 2007 to 2016 Notarbartolo di Sciara taught a course on the science and policy of conserving marine biodiversity at the Università degli Studi di Milano, Italy. From 1985 to 1990 he held the position of contract professor at the University of Parma, teaching courses in "Natural history of large marine vertebrates", "Behavioural ecology of cetaceans", and "Ethology of large marine vertebrates". He has been guest lecturer at the Scripps Institution of Oceanography and Yale University in the U.S., and at many other academic institutions in Europe and Latin America.

== Expanding beyond science ==
In 2024, Notarbartolo di Sciara published “Sailing Across a Wounded Sea” (Springer Nature, ISBN 978-3-031-54596-2, https://doi.org/10.1007/978-3-031-54597-9), the story of an ideal journey around the Mediterranean to meet its non-human inhabitants: a reconstructed collage of really happened episodes collected over half a century as the author observed real animals, exchanged views with people, and argued for such views in the policy arena. In 2025, the Italian publisher Enrico Damiani e Associati published the book in Italian, with the title “Meraviglie di un Mare Ferito: viaggio di un ecologo marino attorno al Mediterraneo” (ISBN 979-12-5456-071-6).

== Honours and awards ==
- Knighthood in the Order of Saint-Charles, received from H.S.H. the Prince Albert II of Monaco on 17 November 2009, for services rendered to the Principality in his quality of Chair of the Scientific Committee of the "Agreement on the Conservation of Cetaceans of the Black Sea, Mediterranean Sea and Contiguous Atlantic Area".
- Honorary citizenship of the town of Sciara, in Sicily, founded in 1670 by Filippo Notarbartolo (the grandfather of the great-grandfather of Giuseppe's great-grandfather), received from the Mayor of Sciara on 12 December 1999. For activities in the field of science, thereby contributing to spreading the name of Sciara around the world.
- European Cetacean Society Mandy McMath Conservation Award, Malta, March 2015.
- "Tridente d’oro" awarded by the International Academy of Underwater Sciences and Technologies on 11 September 1993, on the island of Ustica (Italy), for activities in the field of marine science.
- International prize "Primula d’Oro" awarded by "Uomo e Natura, trimestrale delle aree protette mediterranee", on 28 September 2002, in Naples, for the spearheading of the creation of the Pelagos Sanctuary.
- Career prize "Una vita per il mare" ("A life for the sea"), 10th edition, awarded in 2006 by the City Aquarium of Milano and Verdeacqua.
- Echthrogaleus disciarai, a crustacean parasite of manta rays, named in Notarbartolo di Sciara's honour in 1987 (Benz G.W., Deets G.B. 1987. Echthrogaleus disciarai sp. nov. (Siphonostomatoidea: Pandaridae), a parasitic copepod of the devil ray Mobula lucasana Beebe and Tee Van, 1938 from the Sea of Cortez. Canadian Journal of Zoology 65:685-690).

== Taxon described by him ==
- See Category:Taxa named by Giuseppe Notarbartolo di Sciara
