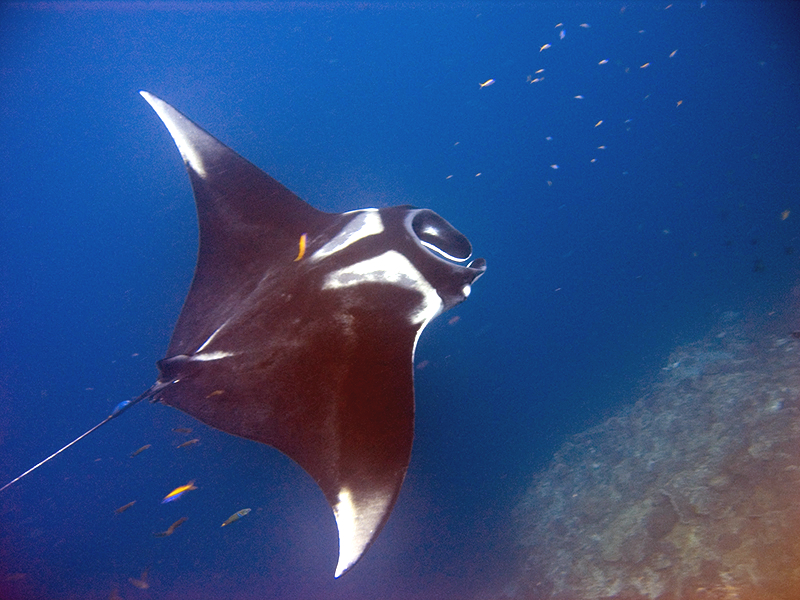

Conservation status
- Endangered (IUCN 3.1)
- CITES Appendix II

Scientific classification
- Kingdom: Animalia
- Phylum: Chordata
- Class: Chondrichthyes
- Subclass: Elasmobranchii
- Order: Myliobatiformes
- Family: Mobulidae
- Genus: Mobula
- Species: M. birostris

Binomial name
- Mobula birostris (Walbaum, 1792)
- Range of the giant oceanic manta ray

Synonyms
- List: Raja birostris Walbaum, 1792; Manta birostris (Walbaum, 1792); Manta brevirostris (Walbaum, 1792) (lapsus calami); Raja manatia Bloch & Schneider, 1801; Cephalopterus vampyrus Mitchill, 1824; Cephalopterus manta Bancroft, 1829; Manta americana Bancroft, 1829; Ceratoptera ehrenbergi Müller & Henle, 1841; Ceratoptera ehrenbergii Müller & Henle, 1841; Manta ehrenbergii (Müller & Henle, 1841); Ceratoptera johnii Müller & Henle, 1841; Brachioptilon hamiltoni Hamilton & Newman, 1849; Manta hamiltoni (Hamilton & Newman, 1849); Cephaloptera stelligera Günther, 1870; Manta raya Baer, 1899

= Giant oceanic manta ray =

Giant oceanic manta ray Temporal range: 23–0 Ma Early Miocene to Present

Species of cartilaginous fish

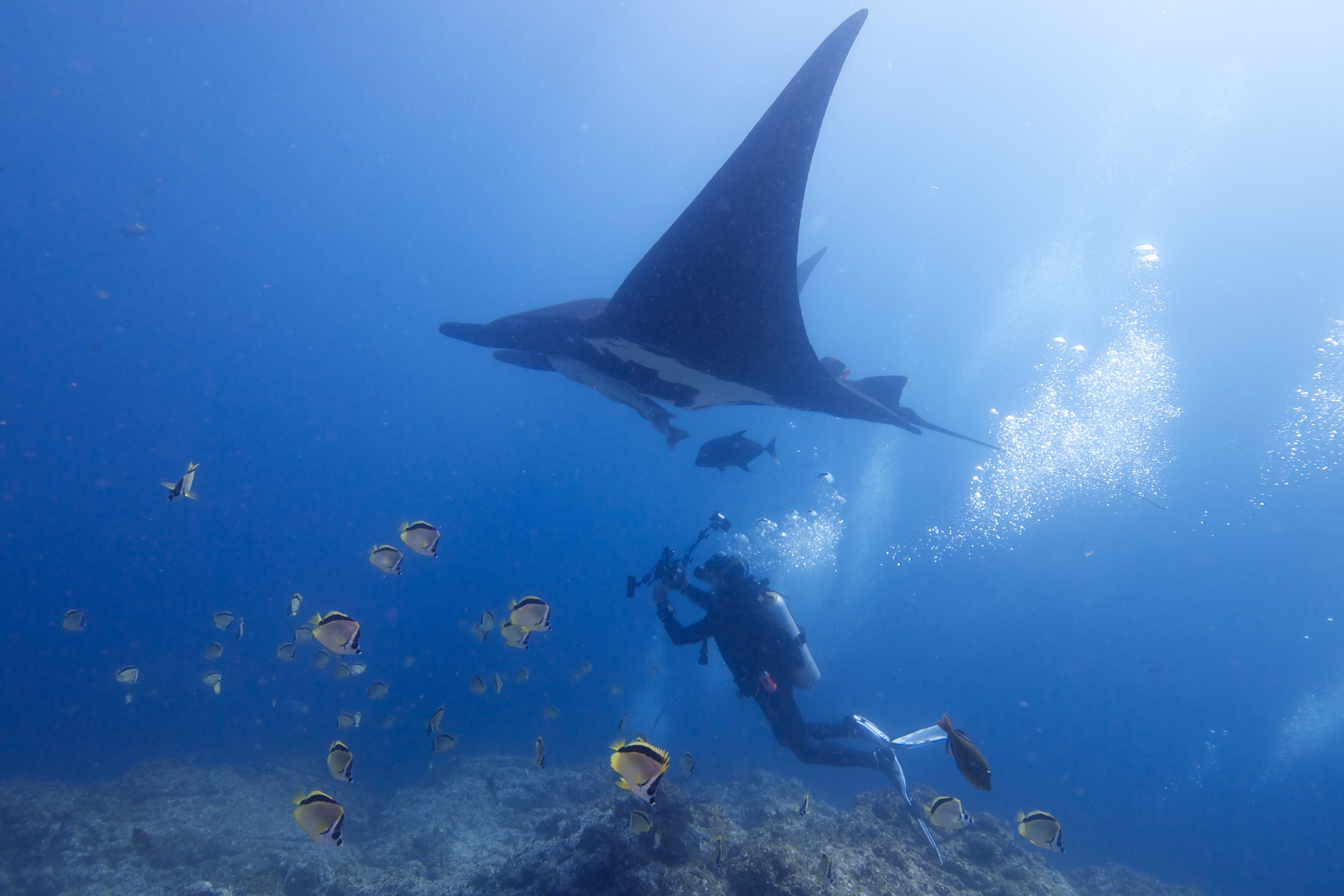
M. birostris swimming with a diver

The giant oceanic manta ray, giant manta ray, oceanic manta ray, or pelagic manta ray (Mobula birostris) is a species of ray in the family Mobulidae and the largest type of ray in the world. It is circumglobal and is typically found in tropical and subtropical waters but can also be found in temperate waters. Until 2017, the species was classified in the genus Manta, along with the smaller reef manta ray (Mobula alfredi). DNA testing revealed that both mantas are closer related to some Mobula species than these are to other Mobula, being claded together. As a result, the two Manta species were absorbed into Mobula to reflect the new classification.

== Distribution and habitat ==
The giant oceanic manta ray has a widespread distribution in tropical and temperate waters worldwide. In the Northern Hemisphere, it has been recorded as far north as southern California and New Jersey in the United States, Aomori Prefecture in Japan, the Sinai Peninsula in Egypt, and the Azores in the northern Atlantic. In the Southern Hemisphere, it occurs as far south as Peru, Uruguay, South Africa, and New Zealand.

It is an ocean-going species and spends most of its life far from land, travelling with the currents and migrating to areas where upwellings of nutrient-rich water increase the availability of zooplankton. The oceanic manta ray is often found in association with offshore oceanic islands.

== Description ==
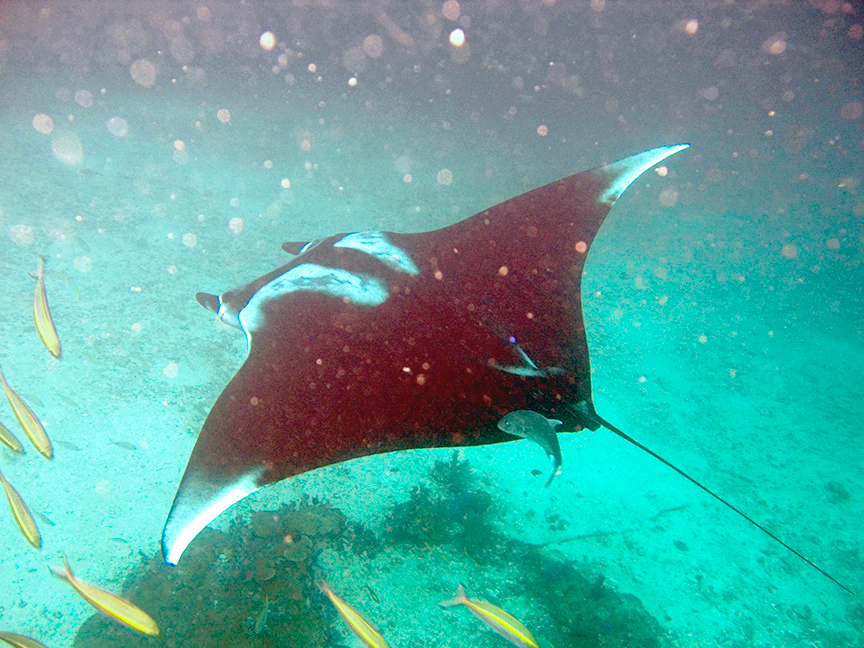
M. birostris with rolled up cephalic fins and characteristic dorsal coloration (Ko Hin Daeng, Thailand)

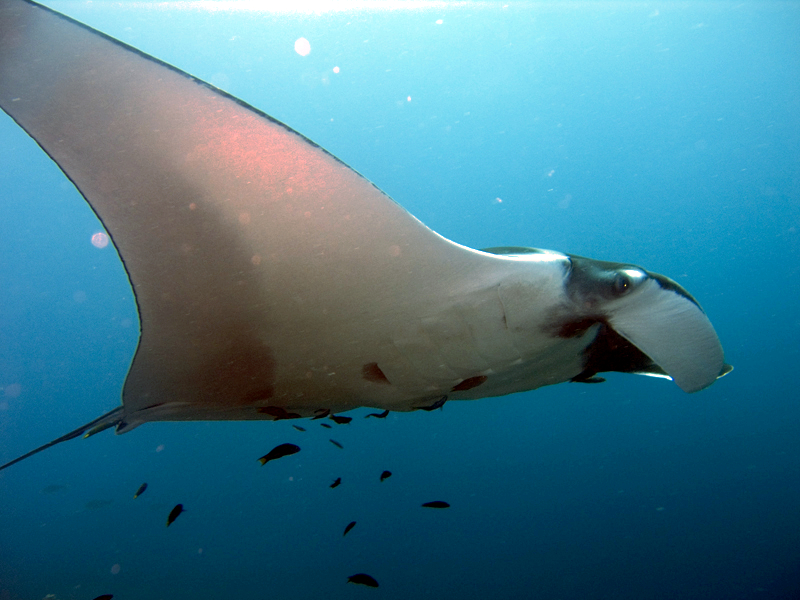
Side view of M. birostris with unfolded cephalic fins (Ko Hin Daeng, Thailand)

The giant oceanic manta ray can grow up to 9 m (30 ft) in length and a disc size of 7 m (23 ft) across, with a weight around 3,000 kg (6,600 lb), but the typical size is 4.5 m (15 ft). It is dorsoventrally flattened and has large, triangular pectoral fins on either side of the disc. At the front, it has a pair of cephalic fins, which are forward extensions of the pectoral fins. These can be rolled up in a spiral for swimming or flared out to channel water into the large, forward-pointing rectangular mouth when the animal is feeding. The teeth are in a band of 18 rows and are restricted to the central part of the lower jaw. The eyes and the spiracles are on the side of the head behind the cephalic fins, and the gill slits are on the ventral (under) surface. It has a small dorsal fin, and the tail is long and whip-like. The manta ray does not have a spiny tail, as do the closely related devil rays (Mobula spp.), but has a knob-like bulge at the base of its tail.

The skin is smooth with a scattering of conical and ridge-shaped tubercles. The colouring of the dorsal (upper) surface is black, dark brown, or steely blue, sometimes with a few pale spots and usually with a pale edge. The ventral surface is white, sometimes with dark spots and blotches. The markings can often be used to recognise individual fish.

=== Physical distinctions ===
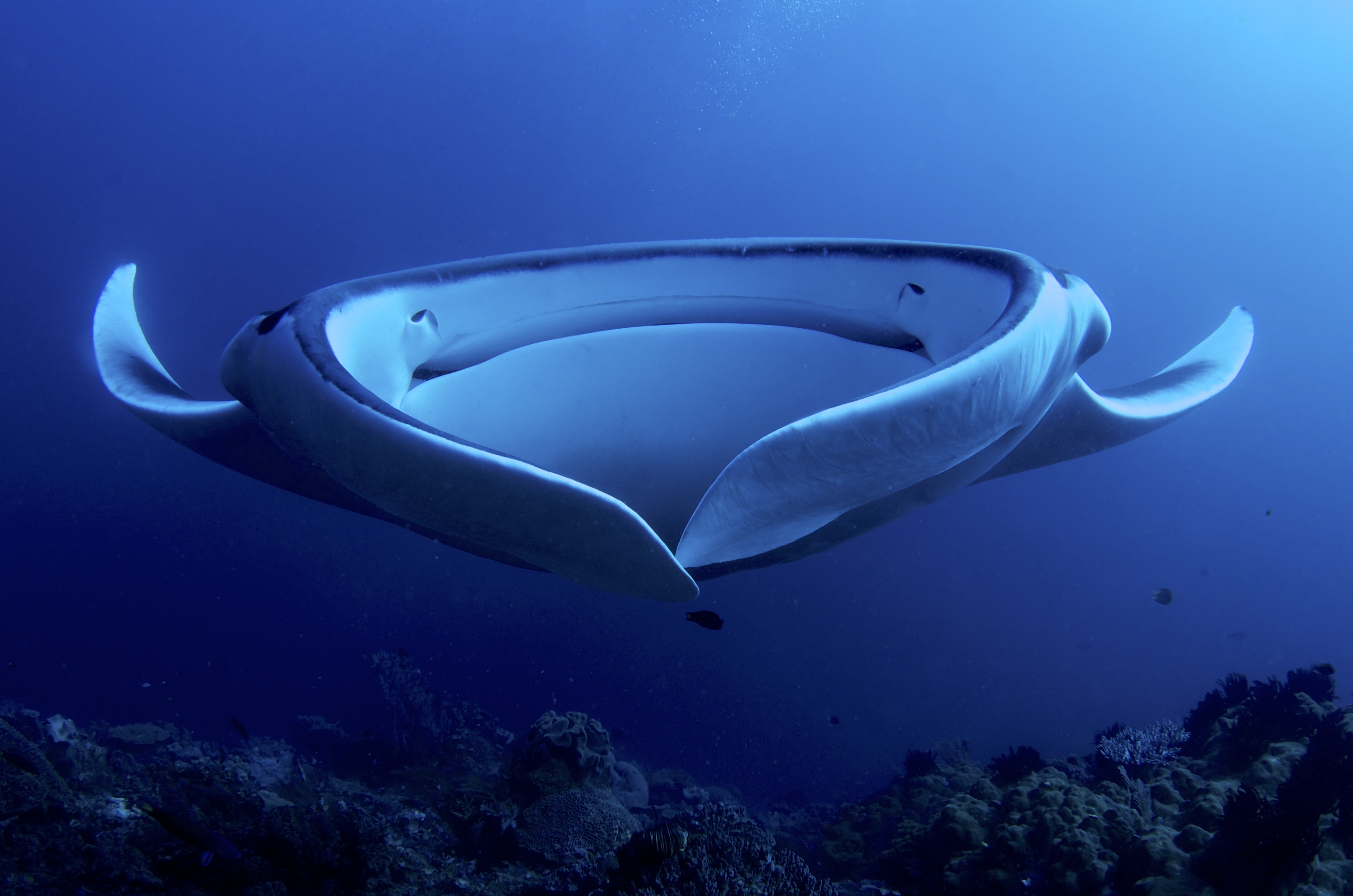
Front of a giant manta ray (M. birostris) with closed mouth, Raja Ampat, West Papua, Indonesia

M. birostris is similar in appearance to M. alfredi, and the two species may be confused, as their distribution overlaps, but distinguishing features exist. The oceanic manta ray is larger than the reef manta ray, typically 4.0–5.0 m (13.1–16.4 ft) compared to 3.0–3.5 m (9.8–11.5 ft). If the observed rays are young, though, their size can easily bring confusion. Only the colour pattern remains an effective way to distinguish them. The reef manta ray has a dark dorsal side with usually two lighter areas on top of the head, looking like a nuanced gradient of its dark dominating back coloration and whitish to greyish, the longitudinal separation between these two lighter areas forms a kind of "Y", while for the oceanic manta ray, the dorsal surface is deep dark and the two white areas are well marked without gradient effect. The line separating these two white areas forms a "T".

The two species can also be differentiated by their ventral coloration. The reef manta ray has a white belly, often with spots between the branchial gill slits and other spots spread across the trailing edge of the pectoral fins and the abdominal region. The oceanic manta ray also has a white ventral coloration, with spots clustered around the lower region of its abdomen. Its cephalic fins, inside of its mouth, and its gill slits are often black.

=== Brain size and intelligence ===
The oceanic manta has the largest brain of any fish, weighing up to 200 g (7.1 oz), which is five to ten times larger than a whale shark's brain. A network of blood vessels surrounds their brains, the rete mirabile, which warms the blood flowing to the brain, and they are one of the few animals (land or sea) that might pass the mirror test, seemingly exhibiting self-awareness.

== Biology ==
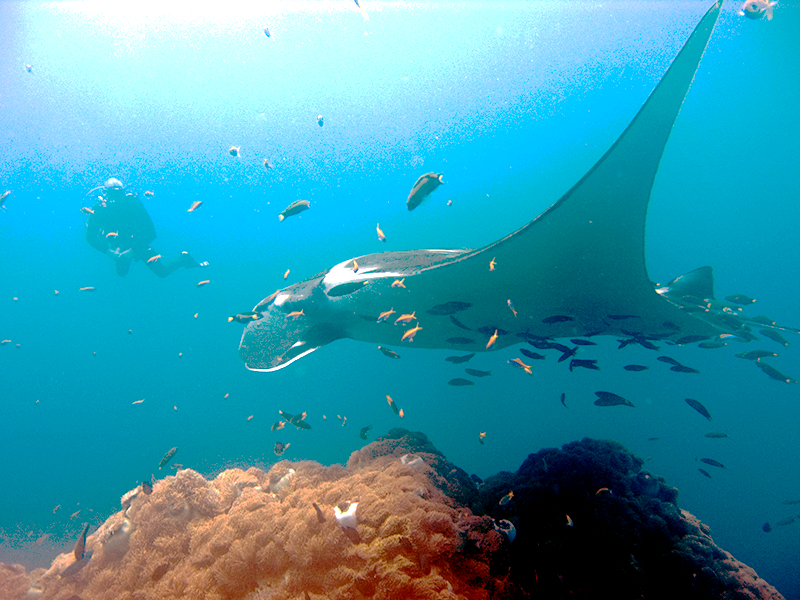
M. birostris at cleaning station (Ko Hin Daeng, Thailand)

When traveling in deep water, the giant oceanic manta ray swims steadily in a straight line, while further inshore, it usually basks or swims idly. Mantas may travel alone or in groups of up to 50. They sometimes associate with other fish species, as well as sea birds and marine mammals. About 27% of their diet is based on filter feeding, and they migrate to coastlines to hunt varying types of zooplankton such as copepods, mysids, shrimp, euphausiids, decapod larvae, and on occasion, varying sizes of fish. When foraging, it usually swims slowly around its prey, herding the planktonic creatures into a tight group before speeding through the bunched-up organisms with its mouth open wide. While feeding, the cephalic fins are spread to channel the prey into its mouth and the small particles are sifted from the water by the tissue between the gill arches. As many as 50 individual rays may gather at a single, plankton-rich feeding site. Research published in 2016 proved about 73% of their diet is mesopelagic (deep-water) sources including fish. Earlier assumptions about exclusively filter feeding were based on surface observations.

The giant oceanic manta ray sometimes visits a cleaning station on a coral reef, where it adopts a near-stationary position for several minutes while cleaner fish consume bits of loose skin and external parasites. Such visits occur most frequently at high tide. It does not rest on the seabed as do many flat fish, as it needs to swim continuously to channel water over its gills for respiration.

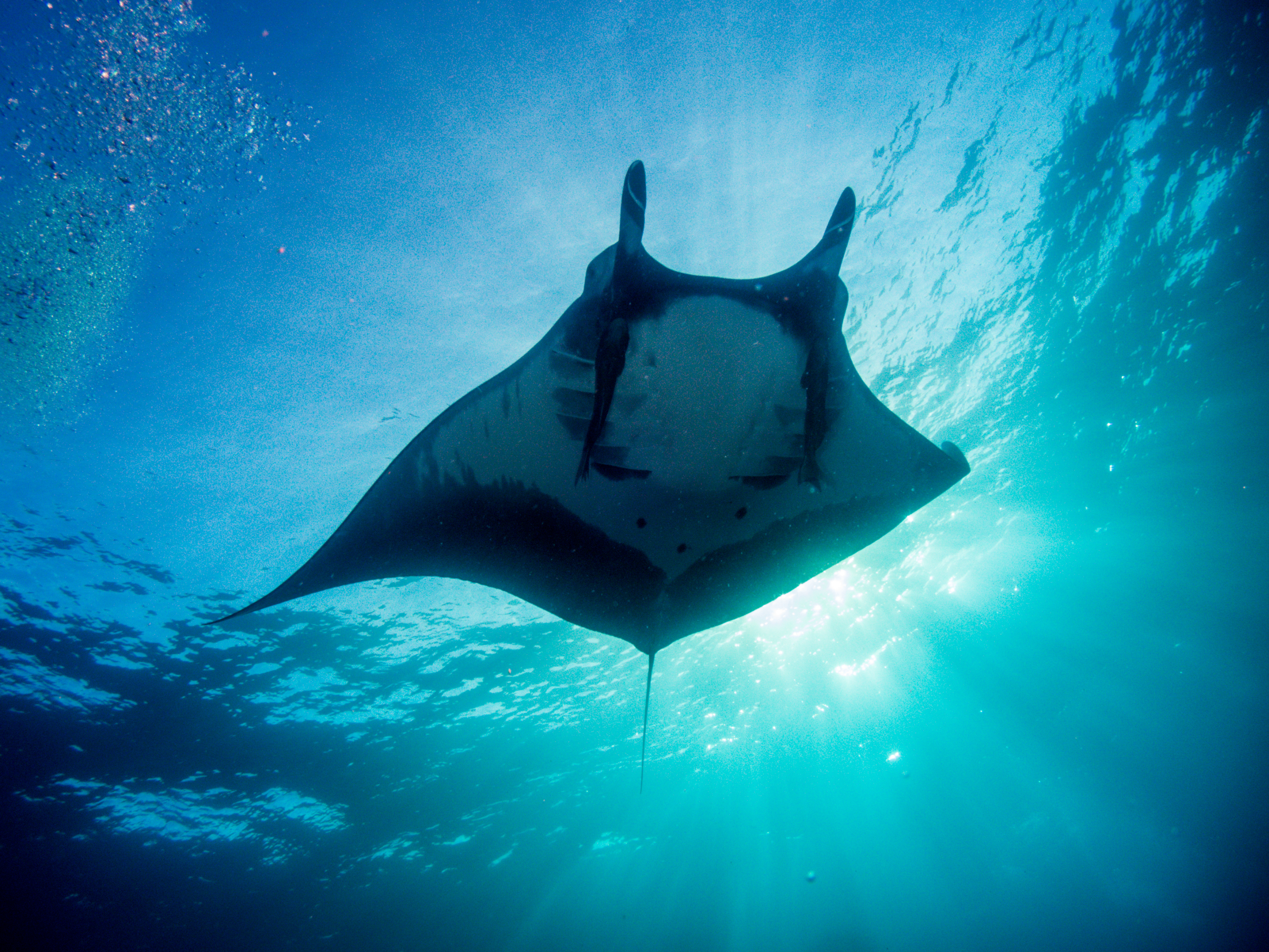
M. birostris at Socorro Island

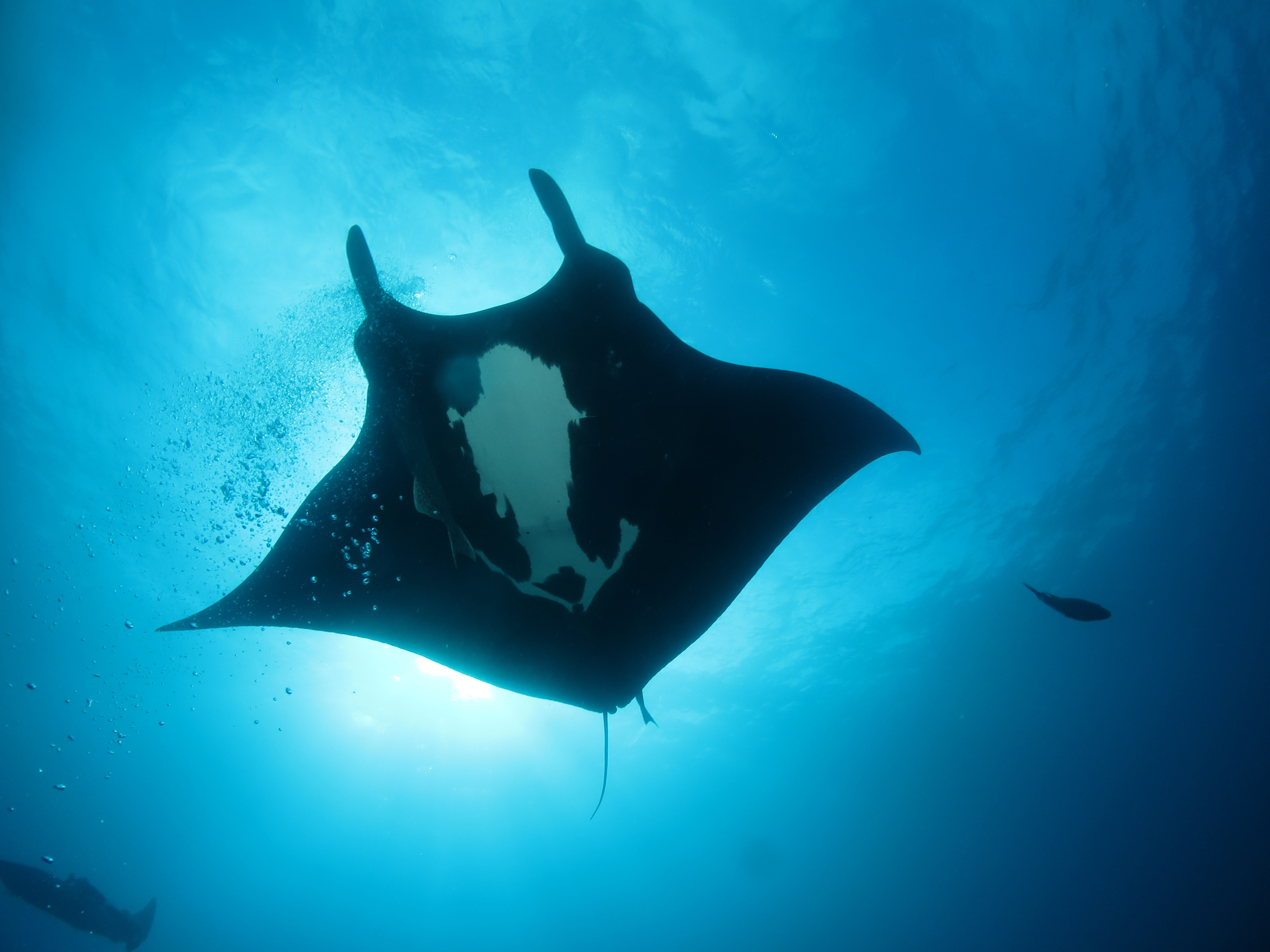
M. birostris (melanistic) at Socorro Island

The oceanic manta ray can swim at speeds up to 24 km/h (15 mph). Because of this speed and its size, it has very few lethal natural predators. Only large sharks such as the tiger shark (Galeocerdo cuvier), the great hammerhead shark (Sphyrna mokarran), the bullshark (Carcharhinus leucas), dolphins, the false killer whale (Pseudorca crassidens), and the killer whale (Orcinus orca) are capable of preying on the ray. Nonlethal shark bites are very common occurrences, with a vast majority of adult individuals bearing the scars of at least one attack.

=== Reproduction ===
Males become sexually mature when their disc width is about 4 m (13 ft), while females need to be about 5 m (16 ft) wide to breed. When a female is becoming receptive, one or several males may swim along behind her in a "train". During copulation, one of the males grips the female's pectoral fin with his teeth and they continue to swim with their ventral surfaces in contact. He inserts his claspers into her cloaca, and these form a tube through which the sperm is pumped. The pair remains coupled for several minutes before going their own way.

The fertilized eggs develop within the female's oviduct. At first, they are enclosed in an egg case and the developing embryos feed on the yolk. After the egg hatches, the pup remains in the oviduct and receives nourishment from a milky secretion. As it does not have a placental connection with its mother, the pup relies on buccal pumping to obtain oxygen. The brood size is usually one, but occasionally, two embryos develop simultaneously. The gestation period is thought to be 12–13 months. When fully developed, the pup is 1.4 m (4 ft 7 in) in disc width, weighs 9 kg (20 lb), and resembles an adult. It is expelled from the oviduct, usually near the coast, and it remains in a shallow-water environment for a few years while it grows. Females only reproduce every two to three years. Long gestation periods and slow reproduction rates make this species highly vulnerable to shifts in population.

== Relation to humans ==
=== Fishery ===
The oceanic manta ray is considered to be endangered by the IUCN's Red List of Endangered Species because its population has decreased drastically over the last 20 years due to overfishing. Because M. birostris feeds in shallow waters, the risk of them getting caught in fishing equipment is higher, especially in surface drift gillnets and bottom set nets. Whatever the type of fishing (artisanal, targeted, or bycatch), the impact on a population with a low fecundity rate, a long gestation period with mainly a single pup at a time, and a late sexual maturity can only be seriously detrimental to a species that cannot compensate for the losses over several decades.

Since the 1970s, fishing for manta rays has been significantly boosted by the price of their gill rakers on the traditional Chinese medicine market. In Chinese culture, they are the main ingredient in a tonic that is marketed to increase immune system function and blood circulation, though no strong evidence supports that the tonic is actually beneficial to health. For this reason and others, gill rakers are sold at relatively high prices – up to $400 per kilogram – and are sold under the trade name pengyusai. In June 2018, the New Zealand Department of Conservation classified the giant oceanic manta ray as "data deficient" with the qualifier "threatened overseas" under the New Zealand Threat Classification System.

=== Pollution ===
The threat of microplastics also exists in the diets of oceanic manta rays. A 2019 study in Indonesia's Coral Triangle was performed to determine if the filter-feeding megafauna of the area were accidentally ingesting microplastics, which can be eaten by filter-feeders either directly (by ingesting layers of plastic polymers that float on the surface of the water in feeding areas) or indirectly (by eating plankton that previously ate microplastics). The results of the study provided ample evidence that filter feeders, such as oceanic manta rays, that lived in the area were regularly consuming microplastics. Though it was also proven via stool samples that some of the plastic simply passed through the digestive systems of manta rays, the discovery is a concern because microplastics create sinks for persistent organic pollutants such as dichloro-diphenyl-trichloroethanes (DDTs) and polycyclic aromatic hydrocarbons. Manta rays that consume microplastics harboring these pollutants can suffer from a variety of health effects that range from short-term negative effects such as the reduction of bacteria in their guts, or long-term effects including pollutant-induced weakening of the population's reproductive fitness over future generations, which could negatively affect population levels of the rays in the future.

M. birostris rays are also victims of bioaccumulation in certain regions. At least one study has shown how heavy metals such as arsenic, cadmium, and mercury can be introduced to the marine environment by pollution and can travel up the trophic chain. For example, a study in Ghana involving the testing of tissue samples from six M. birostris carcasses showed evidence of high concentrations of arsenic and mercury (about 0.155–2.321 μg/g and 0.001–0.006 μg/g, respectively). While the sample size was low, it is a first step towards further understanding the true amount of bioaccumulation that M. birostris undergoes due to human pollution. These high levels of metals can cause harm to the people who consume M. birostris and could also cause health problems for the M. birostris species itself.

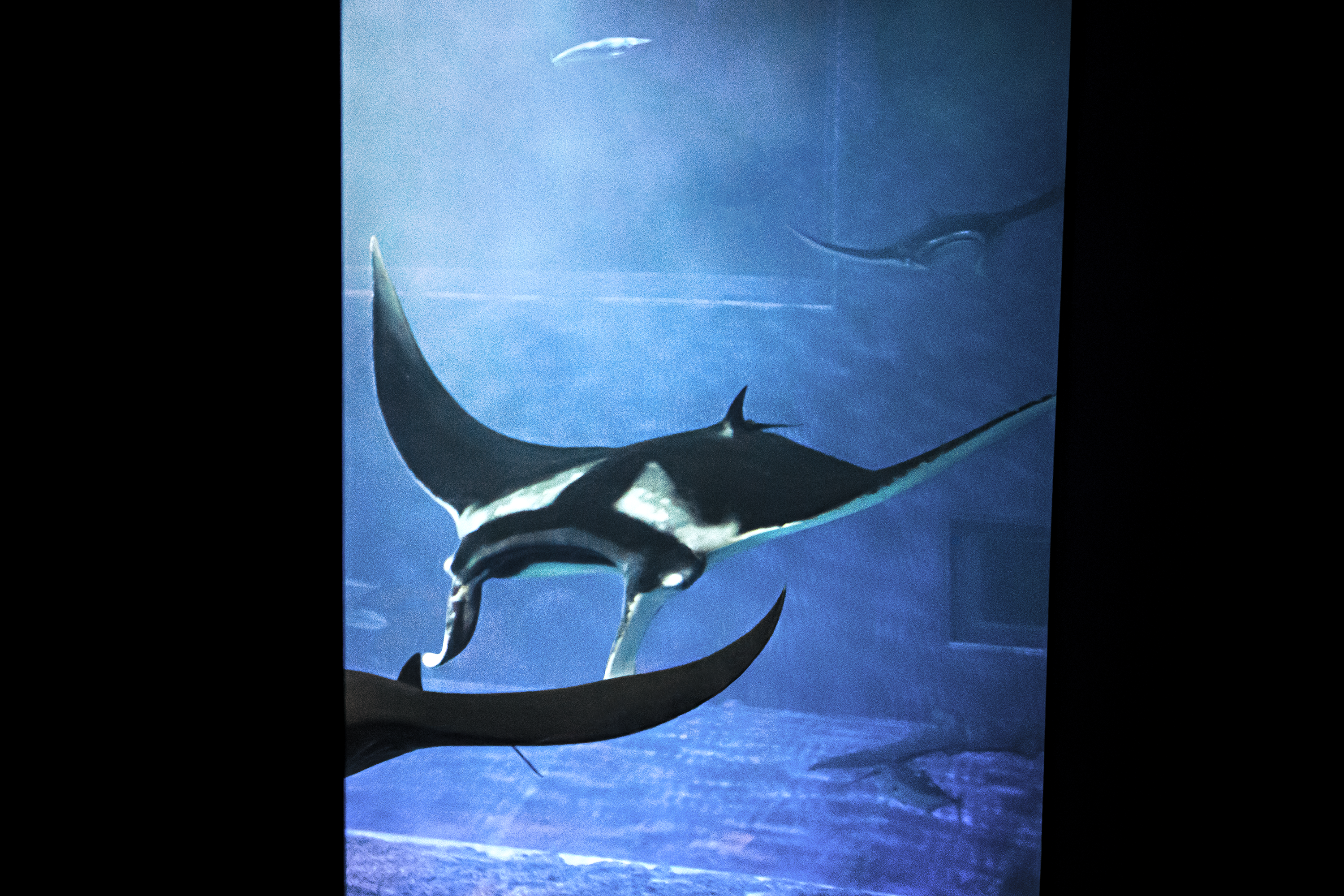
M. birostris at Okinawa Churaumi Aquarium

=== Captivity ===
A few public aquariums have giant manta rays in captivity. Since 2009, captive manta rays have been classified as Ꮇ. alfredi.

Since 2018, Ꮇ. birostris has been exhibited at Nausicaá Centre National de la Mer in France and Okinawa Churaumi Aquarium in Japan. There are also reports that they were kept at the Marine Life Park, part of the Resorts World Sentosa in Singapore.

== See also ==
- Threatened rays
