= Centro Velico Caprera =

Centro Velico Caprera (CVC) is one of the oldest Italian sailing schools and also one of the largest of the Mediterranean Sea. Since its foundation in 1967 it has been attended by over 100,000 students. The legal head office is located at La Maddalena and the base of operations is situated on the island of Caprera, on the Maddalena archipelago. CVC is a non-profit organisation and a member of the ISSA (International Sailing School Association).

== History ==
The school was founded in 1967 based upon the ideas of Vittorio di Sambuy and Marco Notarbartolo di Sciara, who was, at the time, president of Milan’s section of the Italian Navy League. The two authors of the idea were granted the land where the center of the Admiral Alessandro Michelagnoli, at the time Commander in Chief of the Italian Navy, was built. Franco Brambilla, president of the Touring Club Italiano, joined the association guaranteeing the organizational and administrative support of the Touring Club. Finally, Guido Colnaghi, who represented the French association École des Glénans in Italy, shaped the teaching spirit and approach that distinguishes the character of the CVC. The two founding members, Milan’s section of the Italian Navy League and the Touring Club, were then joined by the Students Association in 1975.

== Objectives of the school and Course progression ==
The Centro Velico Caprera, school of sea and sailing, has as its main objective the knowledge and education of the sail training’s basis through practice and experimentation to ensure a safe growth. Another goal is to transmit the fundamentals of maritime consciousness, essential for later offshore sailing. For this reason, life’s organization both on base and on the boats is modeled to transmit to the students the life of a crew. There are three levels of courses:

- 1st or beginner level: sailing dinghies or small cabin cruisers;
- 2nd level: high performance dinghies or short voyages on cabin cruisers;
- 3rd level: racing dinghies (skiff and Foil), 8 meter racing cruisers, or long range voyages on large cabin cruisers.

== The schools location ==
The CVC is located in the southwest part of the island of Caprera, between Punta Coda and the gulf of Porto Palma, and is composed of 3 separate bases. On the side of Punta Coda, the beginner level base consists of military buildings used as dormitories, classrooms, and a canteen. The second base is at the foot of the Fico Mountain, and hosts the students of the 2nd level. The third base, located on the western end of Porto Palma, hosts all students taking courses on cabin cruisers. Furthermore, the CVC staff operates a carpentry, a mechanical workshop and a sail repairing facility.

== Life on the base ==
A typical day at CVC is planned on a tight schedule that all members of the community must respect. Every day students alternate between practical and theoretical lessons, with meals in between. Once a week every student gives his contribute to the school by cleaning the base and helping the cook and the Chief of Operations, who is in charge of the kitchen.

== The instructors ==
The instructors at CVC are all volunteers who are chosen among the school’s best students. After being recommended, which happens through the evaluation of technical knowledge and social skills, in order to become an instructor the student must pass successfully a training course which takes place in spring and autumn. The Instructional positions at CVC are:

- On boat assistant (AdV)
- Instructor (Is)
- Rescue boat captain (CB)

There is a principal instructor for every course, known as:

- Course Manager (CT)

The base is managed by a:

- Base Supervisor

There is also a:

- Chief of Operations (AT)

Who coordinates the students while they clean the base and help in the kitchen.

== The fleet ==
Currently (2014) the CVC's base at Caprera owns and operates the following vessels:

Initiation level on dinghies:

- 17 Laser Bahia
- 35 Laser 2000
- 11 Topaz Argo

Initiation level on small cabin cruisers:

- 6 Dehler 25

2nd level advanced dinghies:

- 12 Laser Vago

2nd level cabin cruisers:

- 6 First 25.7
- 3 SunFast 3200
- 5 First 27

3rd level racing dinghies:

- 5 RS 500
- 3 RS 800

3rd level high performance racing cruisers:

- 4 J80

3rd level long voyage cabin cruisers:

- 2 First 40.7

Safety boats:

- 12 motor powered vessels
