= European Marine Observation and Data Network =

The European Marine Observation and Data Network (EMODnet) is a web portal that brings together marine data, data products and metadata from diverse sources within Europe in a uniform way. It was initiated by the European Commission in response to the EU Green Paper on Future Maritime Policy, launched in June 2006. The main purpose of EMODnet is to unlock fragmented and hidden marine data resources and to make these available to individuals and organisations without restriction, except in special cases. The primary motivation for EMODnet is to stimulate investment in sustainable coastal and offshore activities through improved access to quality-assured, standardised and harmonised marine data.

Now fully operational, the EMODnet web portal provides access to various sub-portals, each of which pertains to a specific thematic group, with some overlap. The thematic groups allow the appropriate experts to define a common structure for the data within each theme, thus ensuring interoperability. There are seven sub-portals: the Bathymetry Portal, the Geology Portal, the Physics Portal, the Chemistry Portal, the Biology Data Portal, the Seabed Habitats Portal, and the Human Activities Portal. The result will be a portfolio of seamless data layers across European and adjacent sea basins. Individuals and organisations are encouraged to contribute marine data on a voluntary basis to ensure that the system remains current. The Data Ingestion portal facilitates this process to ingest marine data for further processing, publishing as open data and contributing to applications for society.

EMODnet also published its VISION 2035, which was elaborated together with experts from different fields. Stated goals are to become "the world’s leading regional hub for marine knowledge", also by considering non-traditional data sources (for example resulting from citizen science studies).

== EMODnet Development ==
The European Marine Observation and Data Network (EMODnet) is a network of organisations supported by the EU’s integrated maritime policy of the European Commission.

=== Phase I ===
The portals are presently operational, delivered during phase I of EMODnet development by a network of 53 organisations. Their progress was guided and monitored by an independent group of experts, in addition to the European Commission services and the European Environment Agency. An interim evaluation has since confirmed the soundness of the approach, recommending advancement to phase II of EMODnet development.

The operation of the portals is largely intuitive, each one granting access to data archives managed by EU Member States and international organisations. This complements ongoing efforts by Member States to ensure proper stewardship of data in accordance with the INSPIRE directive. Via the portals, public and private users of marine data can access standardised observations and data quality indicators, as well as data products, from a limited number of sea basins.

=== Phase II ===
Phase II of EMODnet development involved generating medium-resolution maps of all of Europe's seas and oceans for each of the seven thematic groups (including the Human Activities portal) by 2014. A total of 112 organisations contributed, some with cross-cutting interests. A secretariat was appointed to oversee the development of the EMODnet portal, bringing together all seven thematic groups so that they are accessible from a common gateway.

=== Phase III ===
Phase III of EMODnet development involved the production of multi-resolution sea basin maps.

== Central Portal ==
- https://emodnet.ec.europa.eu/
