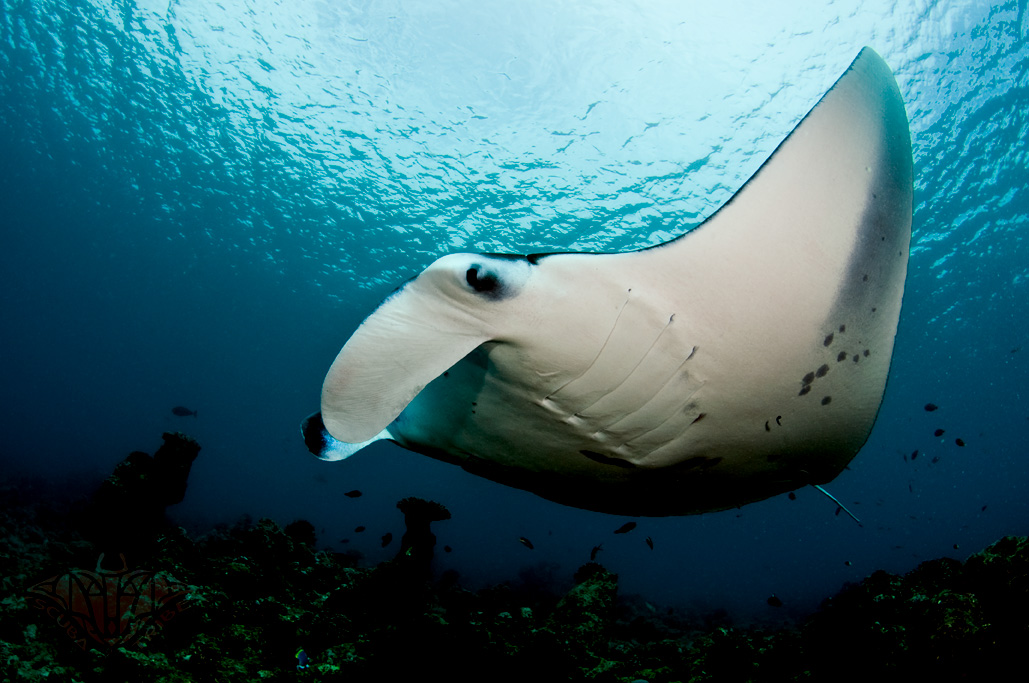
- M. alfredi in the Maldives

Conservation status
- Vulnerable (IUCN 3.1)
- CITES Appendix II

Scientific classification
- Kingdom: Animalia
- Phylum: Chordata
- Class: Chondrichthyes
- Subclass: Elasmobranchii
- Order: Myliobatiformes
- Family: Mobulidae
- Genus: Mobula
- Species: M. alfredi

Binomial name
- Mobula alfredi (Krefft, 1868)
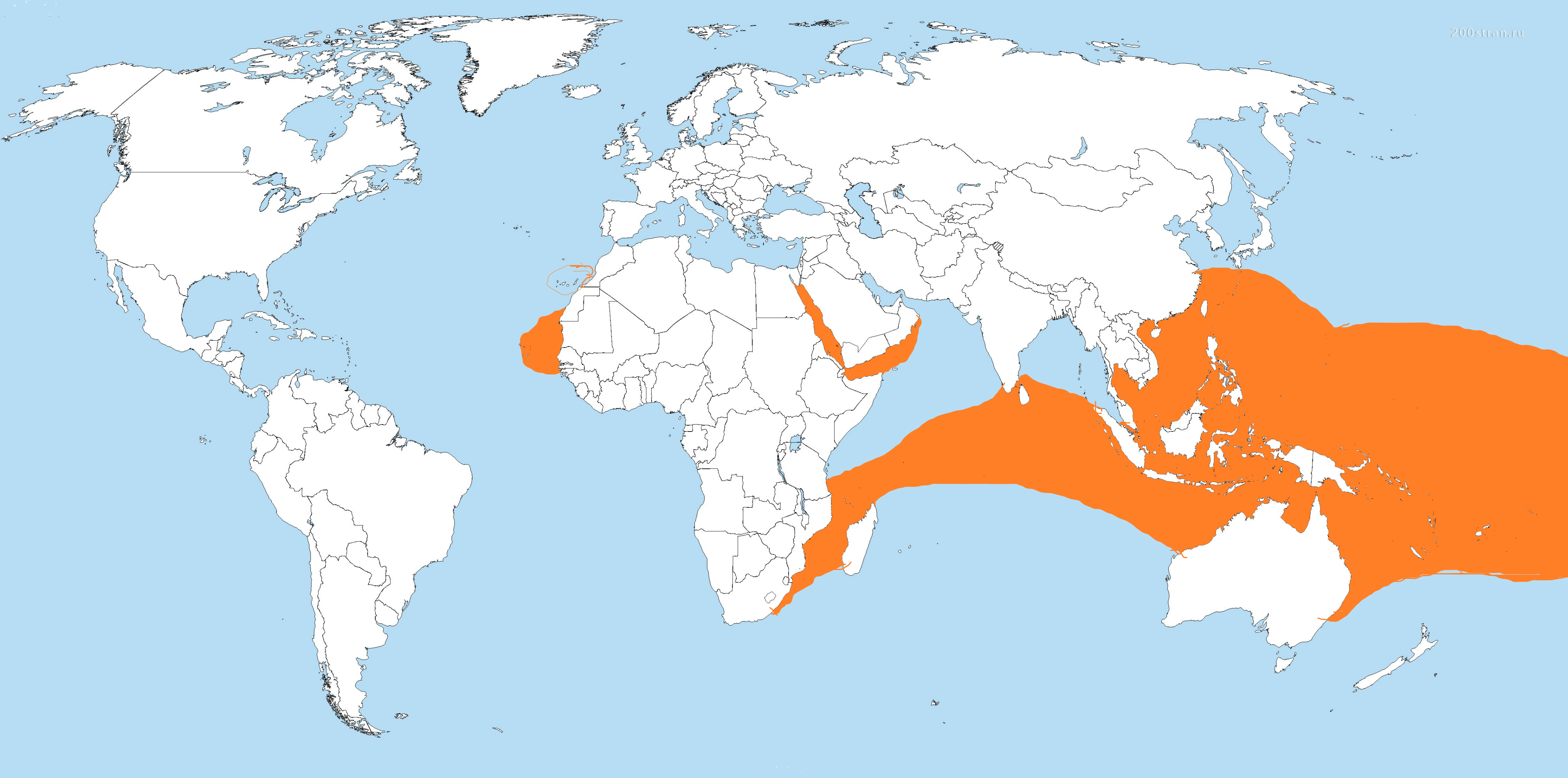

Synonyms
- Manta alfredi

= Reef manta ray =

Mobula alfredi; second largest living species of ray

The reef manta ray or hāhālua (Mobula alfredi) is a species of ray in the family Mobulidae, one of the largest rays in the world. Among generally recognized species, it is the third-largest species of ray, surpassed by the Giant oceanic manta ray and the Atlantic manta ray.

The species was described in 1868 by Gerard Krefft, the director of the Australian Museum. He named it M. alfredi in honor of Alfred, Duke of Edinburgh, the first member of the British royal family to visit Australia. It was originally described as part of the genus Manta but in 2017 was changed, along with the rest of the mantas, to be included as part of the genus Mobula.

Reef manta rays are typically 3 to 3.5 m (9.8 to 11.5 ft) in disc width, with a maximum size of about 5.5 m (18 ft). For a long time included in M. birostris, the status of the reef manta ray as a separate species was only confirmed in 2009. The reef manta ray is found widely in the tropical and subtropical Indo-Pacific, but with a few records from the tropical East Atlantic and none from the West Atlantic or East Pacific. Compared to the giant oceanic manta ray, the reef manta ray tends to be found in shallower, more coastal habitats, but local migrations are sometimes reported. Mobula birostris is similar in appearance to Mobula alfredi and the two species may be confused as their distribution overlaps. However, there are distinguishing features.

== Description ==
The reef manta ray can grow to a disc size of up to 5 m (16 ft) but average size commonly observed is 3 to 3.5 m (11 ft). It is dorsoventrally flattened and has large, triangular pectoral fins on either side of the disc. At the front, it has a pair of cephalic fins which are forward extensions of the pectoral fins. These can be rolled up in a spiral for swimming or can be flared out to channel water into the large, forward-pointing, rectangular mouth when the animal is feeding. The eyes and the spiracles are on the side of the head behind the cephalic fins, and the five gill slits are on the ventral (under) surface. It has a small dorsal fin and the tail is long and whip-like. The manta ray does not have a spiny tail as do the closely related devil rays (Mobula spp.). The color of the dorsal side is dark black to midnight blue with scattered whitish and greyish areas on top head. The ventral surface is white, sometimes with dark spots and blotches. The markings can often be used to recognise individual fish. Mobula alfredi is similar in appearance to Mobula birostris and the two species may be confused as their distribution overlaps. However, there are distinguishing features.

=== Physical distinctions between oceanic manta ray and reef manta ray ===
The first difference could be the size because the giant oceanic manta ray is bigger than the reef manta ray, 4 to 5 m (13–16 ft) on average versus 3 to 3.5 m (9.8–11.5 ft) on average. However, if the observed rays are young, their size can easily bring confusion. Only the color pattern remains a fast and effective way to distinguish them. The reef manta ray has a dark dorsal side with usually two lighter areas on top of the head, looking like a nuanced gradient of its dark dominating back coloration and whitish to greyish, the longitudinal separation between these two lighter areas forms a kind of "Y". While for the oceanic manta ray, the dorsal surface is deep dark and the two white areas are well marked without gradient effect. The line of separation between these two white areas form meanwhile a "T".

Difference can also been made by their ventral coloration, the reef manta ray has a white belly with often spots between the branchial gill slits and other spots spread across trailing edge of pectoral fins and abdominal region. The oceanic manta ray has also a white ventral coloration with spots clustered around lower region of its abdomen. Its cephalic fins, inside of its mouth and its gill slits are often black.

== Distribution and habitat ==
The reef manta ray has a widespread distribution in tropical and subtropical parts of the Indo-Pacific, with few records from the warm East Atlantic and none in the West Atlantic or East Pacific. It can be observed in several often-visited regions such as Hawaii, Fiji, French Polynesia, Micronesia, Bali, Komodo, Maldives, Mozambique, Australia and the Philippines. It is primarily found in coastal regions.

Reef manta rays live in a more or less identical wide area with the possibility of short migration to follow the zooplankton. They therefore have a relatively sedentary behavior with precise areas for cleaning and feeding still within close proximity of coasts, reefs or islands.

== Biology ==
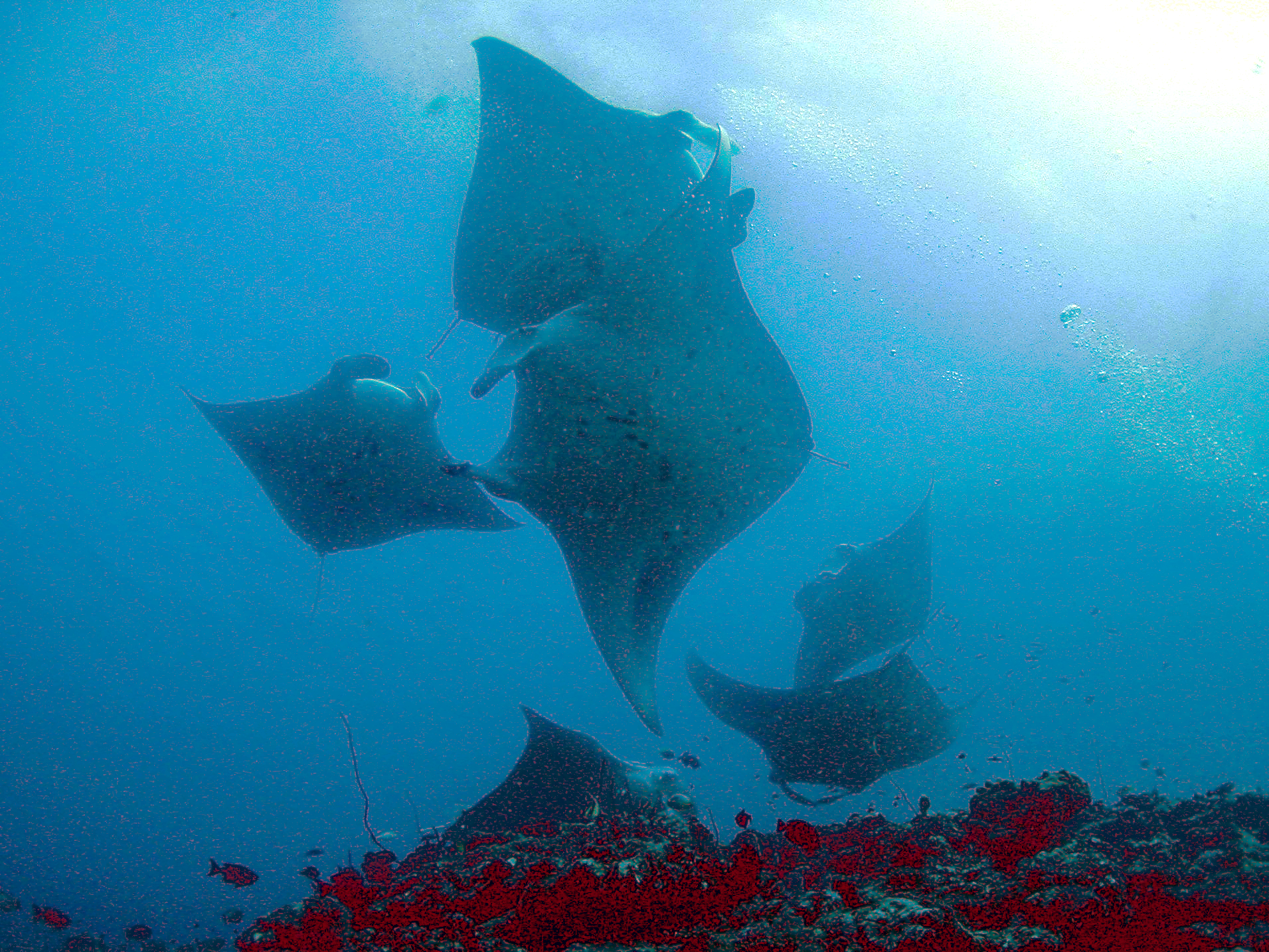
M. alfredi communities in the Maldives

The reef manta ray has a pelagic lifestyle and feeds by filtering sea water in order to catch zooplankton. Research indicates that mantas may live to at least 50 years old.

Like the Oceanic manta ray, it has the largest brain weight and ratio among cold blooded fish. Also, reef manta rays have been confirmed to form social communities in specific populations.

In New Caledonia, there are records of reef manta rays diving up to 672m in search of food. It is believed that this allows Reef manta ray to act in the cold deep waters with certain Rete mirabile in the pectoral fins that can act as countercurrent heat.

The reef manta ray, as the oceanic manta ray, is ovoviviparous. After mating, the fertilized eggs develop within the female's oviduct. At first, they are enclosed in an egg case and the developing embryos feeds on the yolk. After the egg hatches, the pup remains in the oviduct and receives nourishment from a milky secretion. As it does not have a placental connection with its mother, the pup relies on buccal pumping to obtain oxygen. The brood size is usually one but occasionally two embryos develop simultaneously. The gestation period is thought to be 12–13 months. When fully developed, the pup is 1.4 m (4 ft 7 in) in disc width, weighs 9 kg (20 lb) and resembles an adult. It is expelled from the oviduct, usually near the coast, and it remains in a shallow-water environment for a few years while it grows. The disc width of the largest pup born at Okinawa Churaumi Aquarium was about 1.92 m (6 ft 4 in). In 2024, a captive melanistic (black) female gave birth. The first pup measured 160 cm in disc width, weighed 42 kg, and—like its mother—was also melanistic. After roughly one year, the first pup had grown to 270 cm and 160 kg.

== Status and threats ==
=== Natural predation ===
Because of its large size and velocity in case of danger (24 km/h or 15 mph escape speed), the reef manta ray has very few natural predators which can be fatal to it. Only big sharks, for example the tiger shark (Galeocerdo cuvier), the great hammerhead shark (Sphyrna mokarran) or the bull shark (Carcharhinus leucas), and also the false killer whale (Pseudorca crassidens) and the killer whale (Orcinus orca) are known to kill and eat mantas. The reef manta ray may escape an attack, leaving it with a part of the wing missing.

The reef manta ray is considered to be vulnerable by the IUCN in its Red List of Threatened Species because their population decreased drastically over the last twenty years due to overfishing. Whatever the type of fishing (artisanal, targeted or bycatch), the impact on a population which has a low fecundity rate, a long gestation period with mainly one pup at a time, and a late sexual maturity can only be seriously detrimental as the species cannot compensate for the losses over several decades. In recent years, fishing for manta rays has been significantly boosted by prices of their gill rakers on the market for traditional Chinese medicine. Pseudo-medicinal virtues assigned to them without proven scientific basis and a clever marketing strategy generate significant demand.

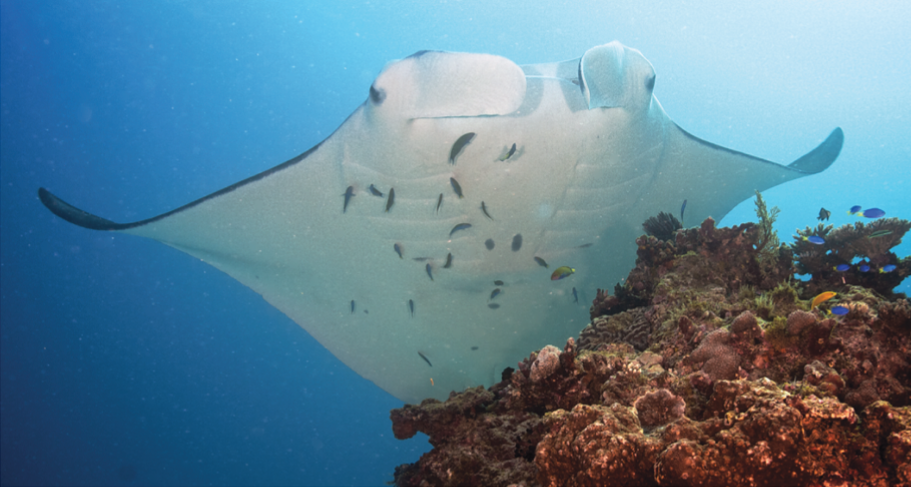
M. alfredi at a cleaning station, maintaining a near-stationary position on top a coral patch for several minutes while being cleaned by cleaner fish

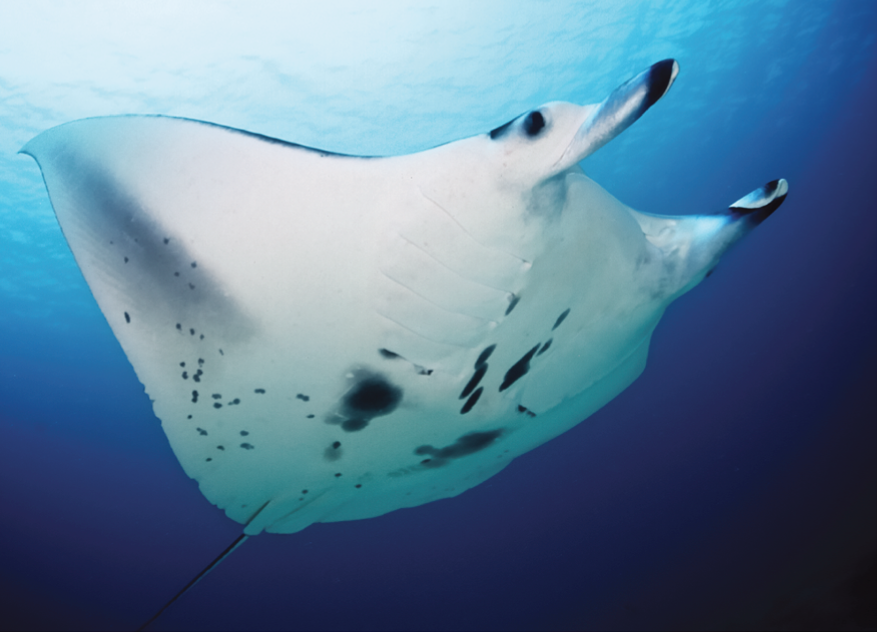
M. alfredi cruising (swimming with cephalic lobes rolled and mouth closed)

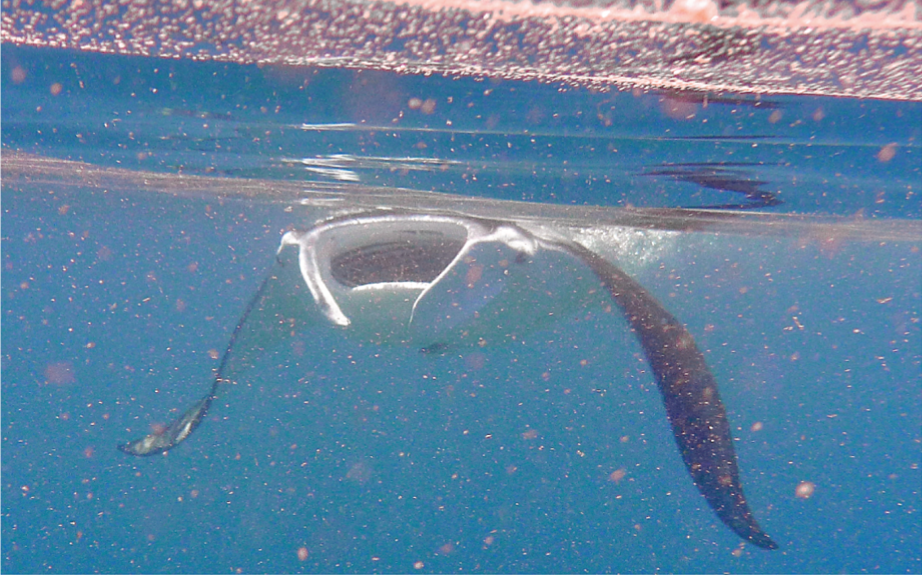
Foraging M. alfredi ram feeding, swimming against the tidal current with its mouth open and sieving zooplankton from the water

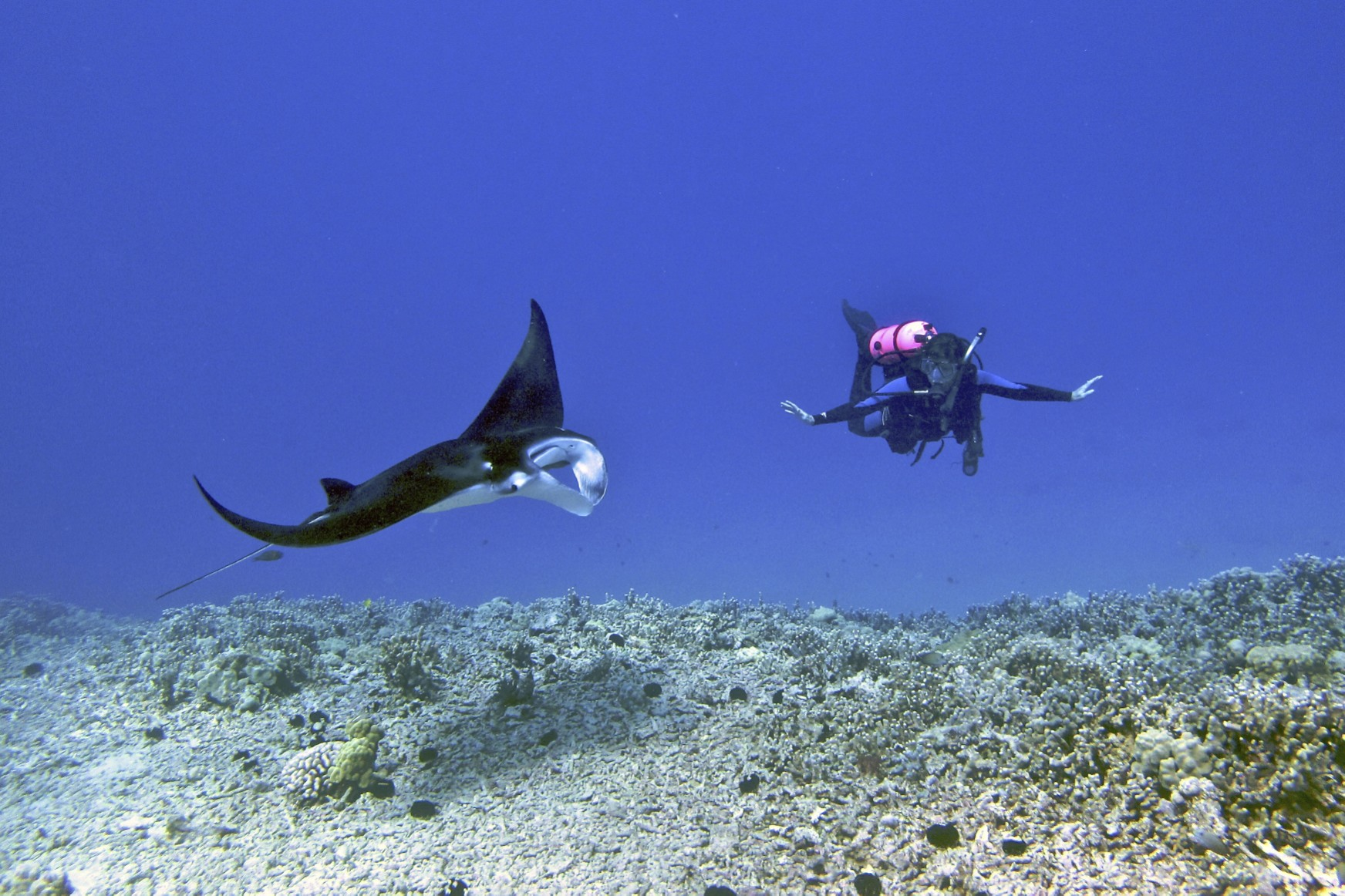
Juvenile M. alfredi with a diver (Kona, Hawaii)

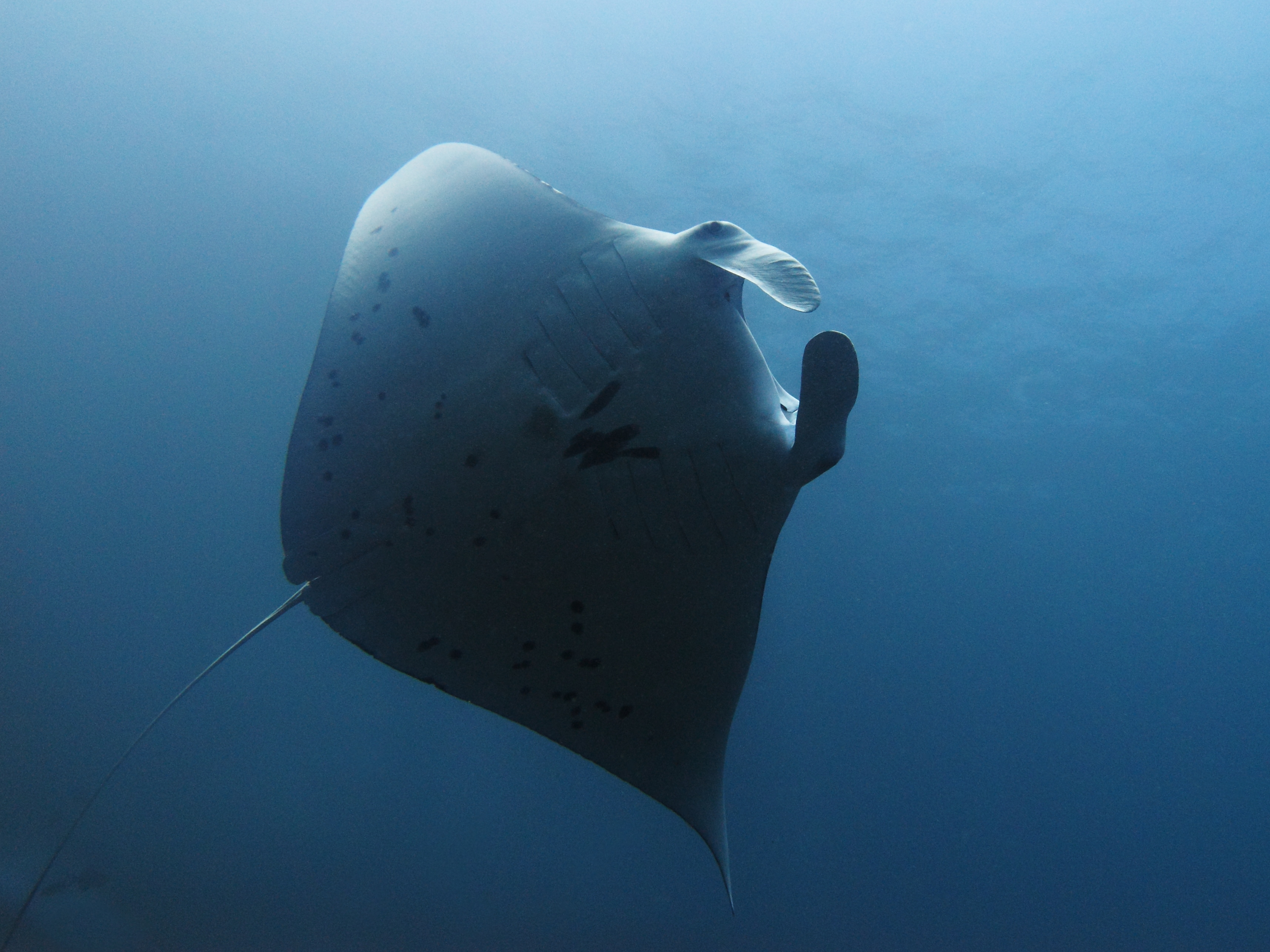
M. alfredi from Komodo, Indonesia

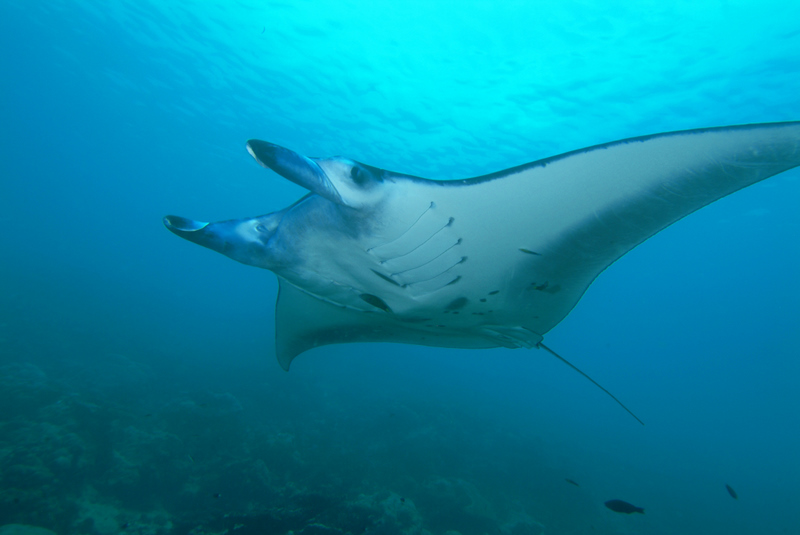
M. alfredi from Yap, Micronesia

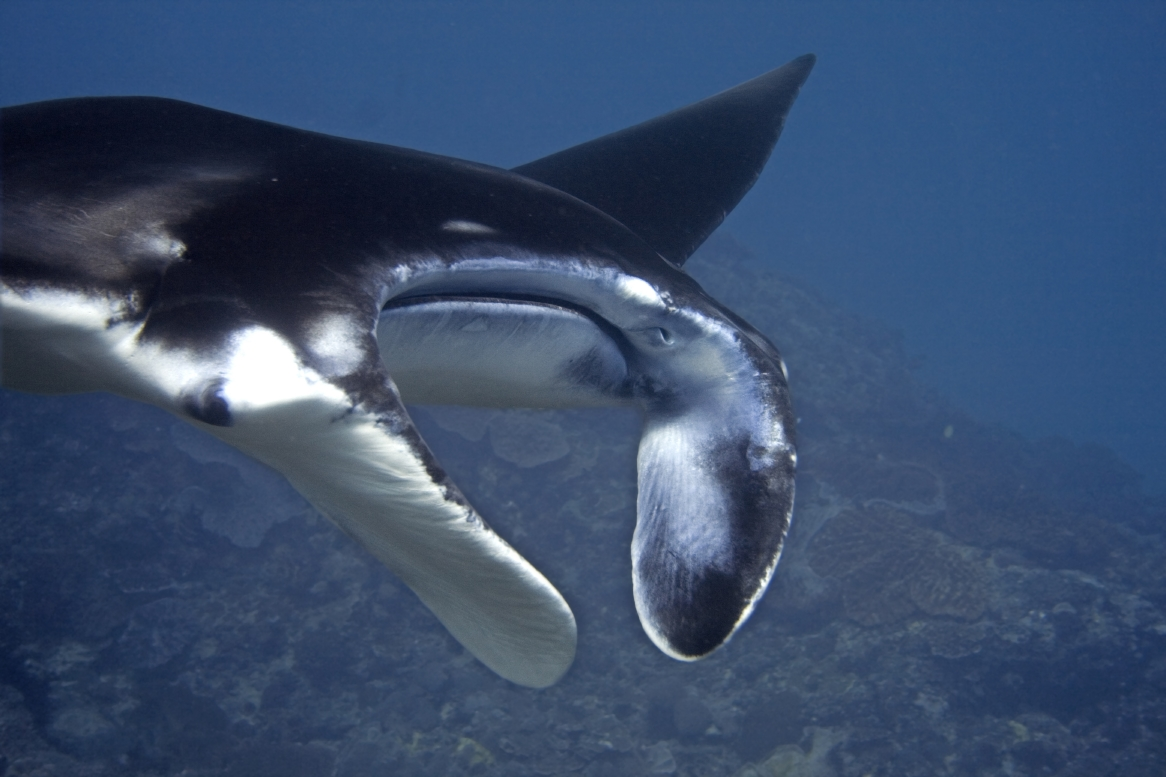
M. alfredi from Bali, Indonesia
