= Ocean Park, Uruguay =

Ocean Park
- Resort
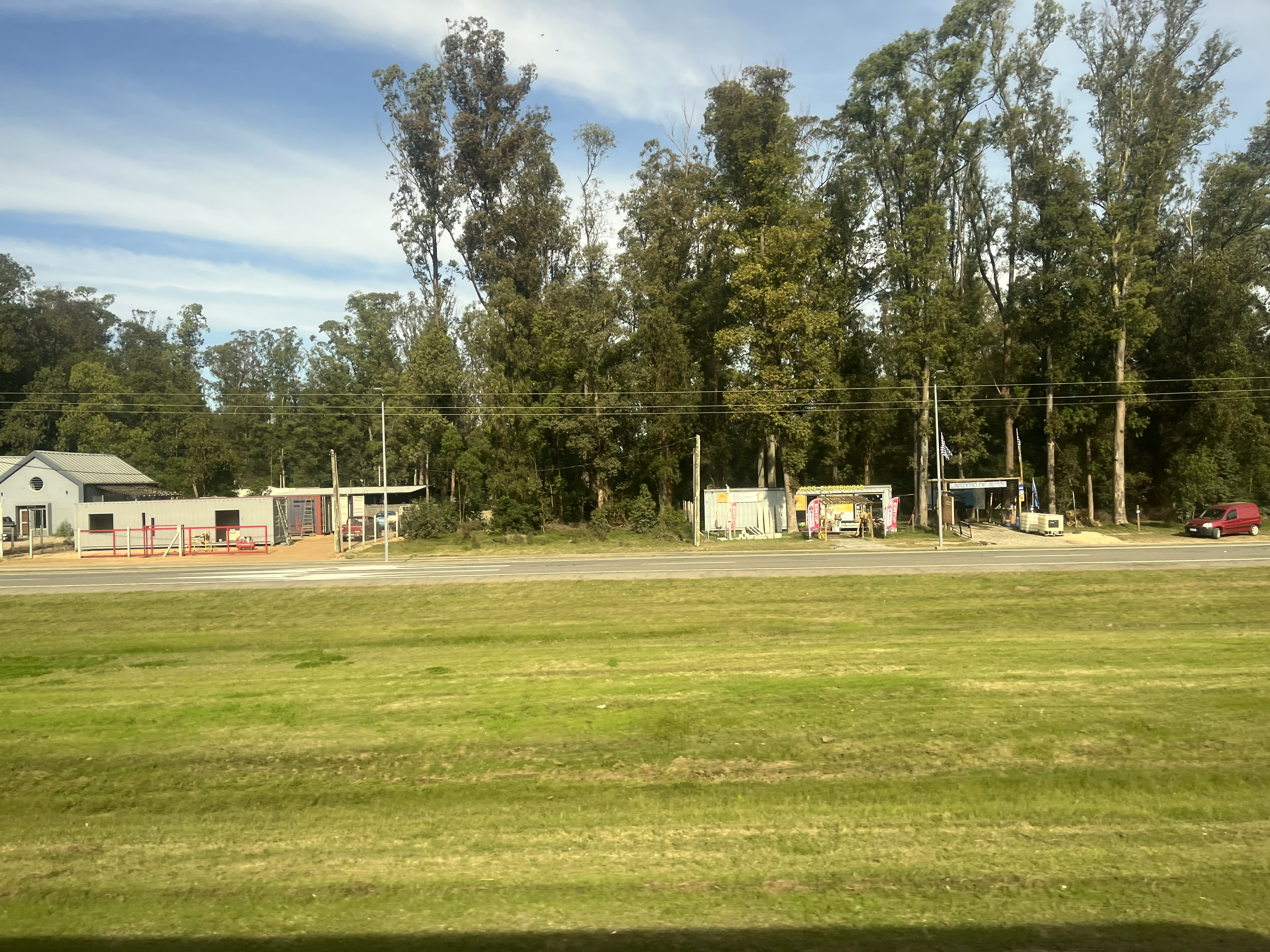

- Location in Uruguay
- Coordinates: 34°52′30″S 55°8′25″W
- Country: Uruguay
- Department: Maldonado Department

Population (2011)
  - Total: 234
- Time zone: UTC -3
- Postal code: 20004
- Dial plan: +598 42 (+6 digits)
- Climate: Cfa

Ocean Park is a resort (balneario) in the Maldonado Department of Uruguay.

== Geography ==
The resort is located on the coast of Río de la Plata, about 6 kilometres (3.7 mi) west of Punta Ballena and 7 kilometres (4.3 mi) (by road) east of the resort Punta Negra. It borders the resort Sauce de Portezuelo to the west and to the resort Chihuahua to the east, with the creek Arroyo del Potrero separating it with the latter. Its northern limit is the Ruta Interbalnearia, also marked as Route 93 for this area, and across from it are the towns La Capuera, El Pejerrey and the Capitán de Corbeta Carlos A. Curbelo International Airport, on the shore of the Laguna del Sauce.

== Population ==
In 2011 Ocean Park had a population of 234 permanent inhabitants and 280 dwellings.

Year	Population	Dwellings
1963	10	4
1975	4	3
1985	16	10
1996	35	20
2004	63	194
2011	234	280

Source: Instituto Nacional de Estadística de Uruguay
