= Whale watching =

Viewing cetaceans in their habitats

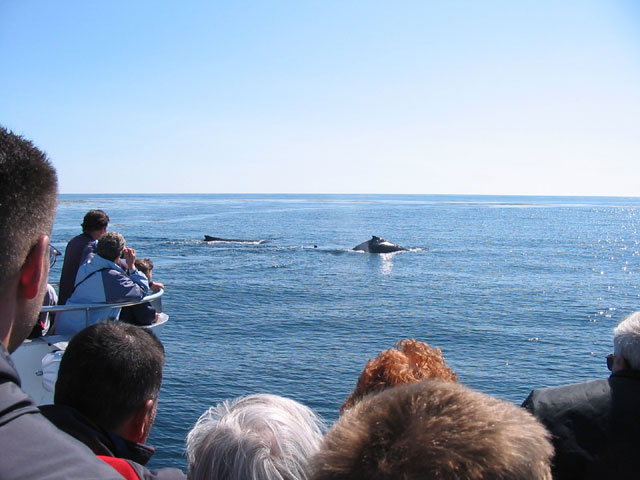
Whale watching off the coast of Bar Harbor, Maine

Whale watching is the practice of observing whales, dolphins and porpoises (cetaceans) in their natural habitat. Whale watching is mostly a recreational activity (cf. birdwatching), but it can also serve scientific and/or educational purposes. A study prepared for International Fund for Animal Welfare in 2009 estimated that 13 million people went whale watching globally in 2008. Whale watching generates $2.1 billion per annum in tourism revenue worldwide, employing around 13,000 workers. The size and rapid growth of the industry has led to complex and continuing debates with the whaling industry about the best use of whales as a natural resource.

== History ==
Organized whale watching started in 1950 in the United States, when Cabrillo National Monument in San Diego was declared a public venue for observing the near-shore winter migration of gray whales (Eschrichtius robustus); the spectacle attracted 10,000 visitors in its first year. In 1955 the first water-based whale watching began in the same area, charging customers $1 per trip to view the whales at close quarters. The industry spread throughout the western coast of the United States over the following decade.

In 1971 the Montreal Zoological Society commenced the first commercial whale watching activity on the eastern coast of North America, offering trips in the St. Lawrence River estuary to view fin and beluga whales. Whale watching of gray whales spread up the West Coast and down to Baja California over the 1970s. The commercial growth of whale watching was tied to humpback whales, whose acrobatic behavior such as breaching (jumping out of the water) and tail-slapping were good for tourist photography. Commercial tours to see humpbacks began in Hawaii and New England in 1975.

By the mid-1970s, live captures for aquaria had reduced the orca populations in the coastal waters of British Columbia and Washington, particularly the southern resident orca population; in the 1980s commercial whale watching became an alternative means of viewing and appreciating orcas. In 1981 commercial whale watching existed in three countries, with revenue of US$4 million from 400,000 customers. In 1984 Erich Hoyt wrote The Whale Watcher's Handbook, the first comprehensive guide to whale watching.

Whale watching tourism grew substantially after the mid-1980s. The first worldwide survey of whale watching was conducted by Hoyt for the Whale and Dolphin Conservation Society (WDCS) in 1992 (updated in 1995 and 2001), and was submitted by the UK government to the International Whaling Commission (IWC) meetings as a demonstration of the value of living whales. By 2008 an estimated 13 million people had been whale watching (up from 9 million in 1998 years earlier), and around 3,300 commercial whale watching operations existed in 119 countries, employing 13,200 people. Direct revenue from whale watching trips was estimated at US$0.87 billion, and indirect revenue of $2.1 billion was spent by whale watchers in tourism-related businesses. The countries with the most whale-watching tourists in 2008 were the USA (4,899,809), Australia (1,635,374), Canada (1,165,684), the Canary Islands of Spain (611,000), South Africa (567,367), and New Zealand (546,445). Whale watching grew at a rate of 12% per annum in the 1990s, faster than the rest of the tourism industry.

Whale watching is of particular importance to developing countries. Coastal communities have started to profit directly from the whales' presence, significantly adding to popular support for the protection of these animals from commercial whaling and other threats such as bycatch and ship strikes using the tool of marine protected areas and sanctuaries. In 2007, the Humane Society International sponsored a series of workshops to introduce whale watching to coastal Peru and commissioned a blueprint for high quality, sustainable whale watching. The International Whaling Commission first developed a Strategic Plan for Whale Watching in 2011, and later plans were released in 2018 and 2025. The main outcome from these plans was development of an online Whale Watching Handbook for regulators, the industry, and people planning whale-watching trips.

== Impact of whale watching ==
In 1975 the IWC Scientific Committee expressed concern about the effect of boat excursions into whale breeding lagoons in Mexico and the impact on female gray whales and their calves, followed by a 1976 request to the US and Mexican governments to develop whale-watching regulations. Thus, from the early days of commercial whale watching there has been debate about its possible negative impact.

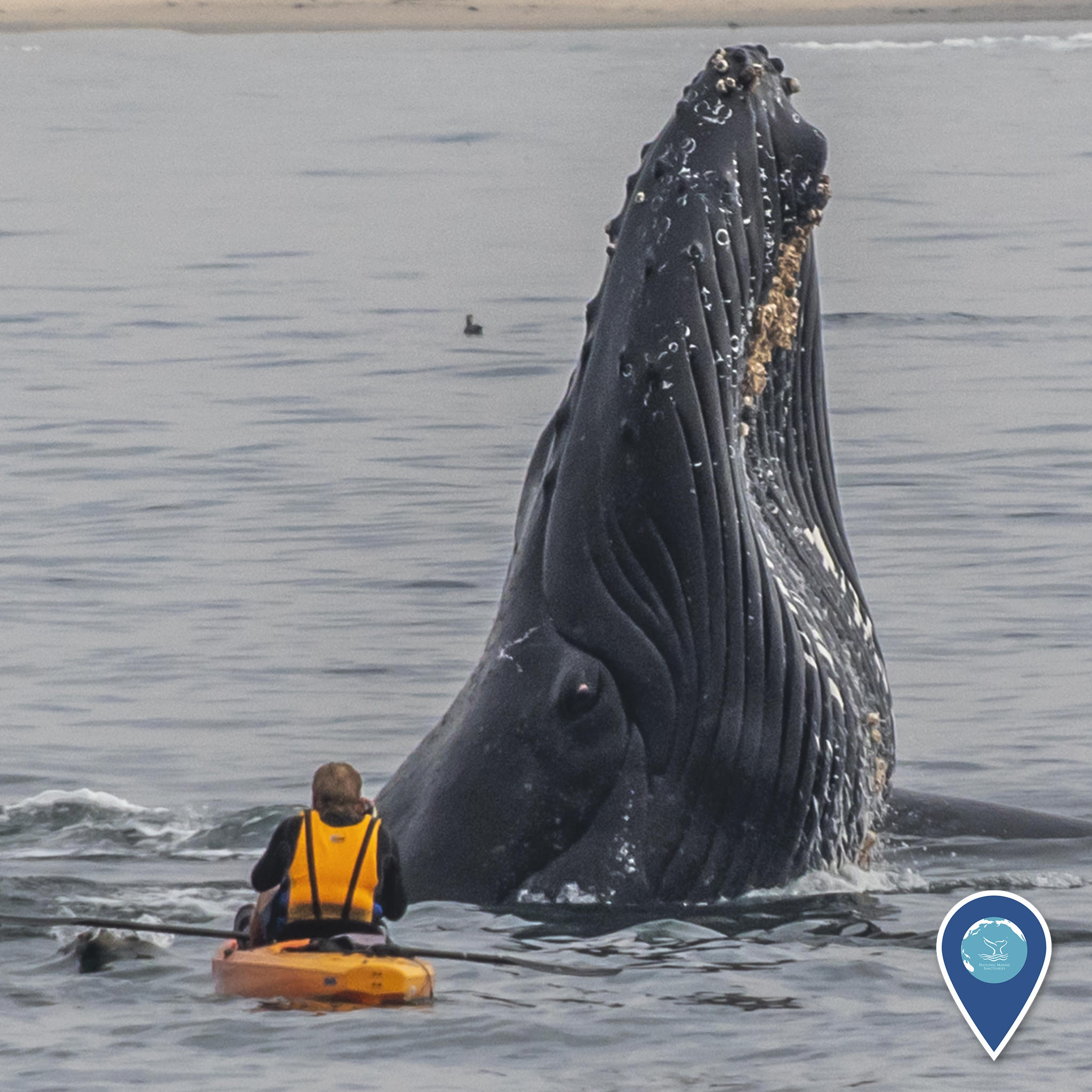
Approaching a humpback whale too closely at Monterey Bay National Marine Sanctuary; stealthy vessels such as kayaks can startle or harass whales

In the 1980s, following the moratorium on whaling, interest shifted to the "non-consumptive" (non-lethal) uses of cetaceans, including whale watching. The assumption that whale watching was non-consumptive and inflicted no harm on whales allowed for the largely unregulated and rapid growth of the industry in the '80s and '90s. There is now, however, strong evidence that whale watching can significantly affect the biology and ecology of whales and dolphins: the rapid growth of the number of whale watching trips and the size of vessel used may affect behavior, migratory patterns and breeding cycles.

Many cetaceans species from migrating whales to pods of dolphins view whale watching boats as a risk, and respond by avoiding them in the short term, and abandoning their habitat in the long term. If they are unable to shift habitats, their breeding can be suppressed, something observed in populations of bottlenose dolphins in Doubtful Sound, New Zealand. The close approaches of tourist vessels to whales can lead to accidental strikes, stressful acoustic pollution from engines, and anti-predator responses from the whales. Not all whale watching necessarily has a negative impact, especially if the affected population is large and wide-ranging enough so that only a small proportion are exposed to it.

Environmental campaigners, concerned by what they consider the "quick-buck" mentality of some boat owners, continue to strongly urge all whale watcher operators to contribute to local regulations governing whale watching (no international standard set of regulations exist, because of the huge variety of species and populations). The IWC's Scientific Committee developed general principles for responsible management of the whale watching industry in 1996, and in 2012 compiled and translated whale watching guidelines from 50 countries. Some general guidelines for whale watching recommended by the IWC include:

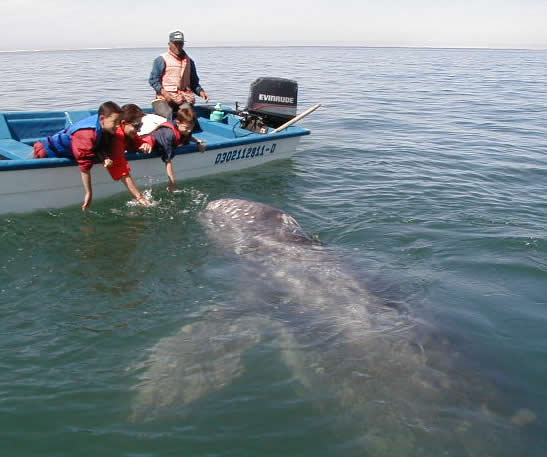
Tourists in El Vizcaíno Biospere Reserve trying to touch a whale, contrary to the IWC guidelines

- Slow or "no wake" speed, no faster than the whale: a speed of less than 10 knots lowers mortality by 80–90% in the case of an accidental collision
- Avoid sudden changes in direction, speed, or engine noise
- Approach animals from angles where they will not be taken by surprise, and especially not head-on
- Minimize noise, but make sure cetaceans can detect the viewing vessel at all times. Quet viewing platforms such as surfboards can startle a whale that has not heard them approach.
- Do not pursue, head off, encircle, or split up groups of whales
- Do not encourage direct interaction with the viewing vessel
- Consider cumulative impact and noise, and minimize number of boats at any one time/per day
- Do not harass whales while they are feeding, mating, nursing, or resting
- Avoid direct interaction with cetaceans; for example, swimming with dolphins. (Note: This last rule is often disregarded; in New Zealand, rules adopted under the Marine Mammals Protection Act specifically allow swimming with dolphins and seals but not with juvenile dolphins or a pod of dolphins that includes juvenile dolphins.))

The IWC also encourages land-based over marine whale watching, stresses the use of whale watching as an opportunity for research on whales, and recommends developing and refining management provisions and Codes of Conduct while cautiously monitoring the effect on cetaceans. For example, the Icelandic Whale Watching Association developed a Code of Conduct, including an "approaching zone" of 3000–300 m, where vessels reduced speed and limited their encounters to 20–30 minutes, and a "caution zone" within 300 m, where engines are shut off and 50 m distance was maintained.

== Locations ==
Whale watching tours are available in various locations and climates. By area, they are:

=== Atlantic and Indian oceans ===
==== South Africa ====
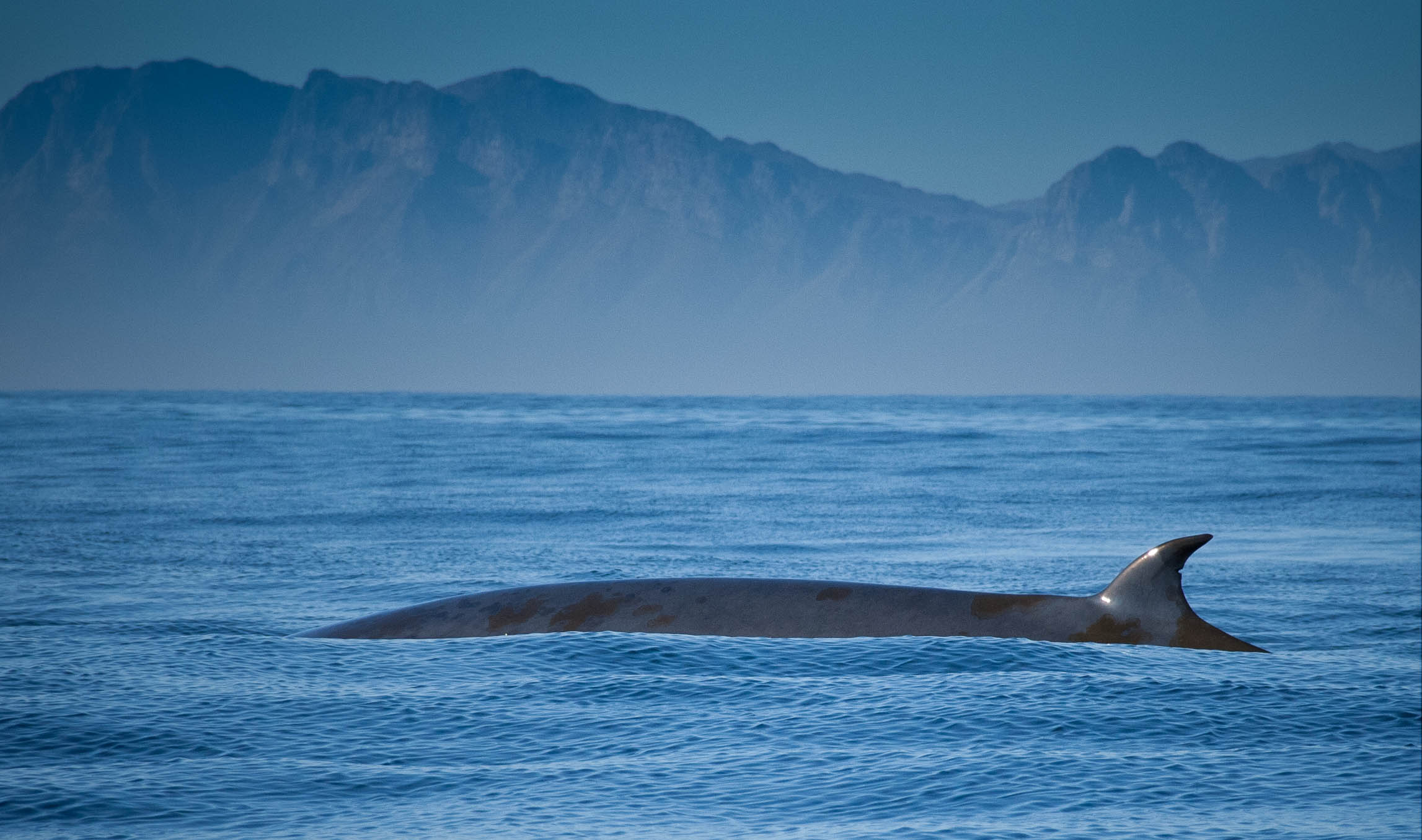
Bryde's whale in False Bay, South Africa

In South Africa, the town of Hermanus is one of the world centers for whale watching. Between May and December southern right whales come so close to the Cape shoreline that visitors can watch whales from their hotels. The town employs a "whale crier" (cf town crier) to walk through the town announcing where whales have been seen.

You can watch the whales in Hermanus from the cliff tops, from a boat or the air. Boat-based whale watching tours are available out of the Hermanus New harbour which allows the public to view southern right whales from June till Mid December. Port Elizabeth runs a boat-based whale watching tour out of the Port Elizabeth harbour which allows the public to view southern right whales from July to November, humpback whales from June to August and November to January, and Bryde's whales all year round, up-close. Visitors can also see humpback whales from the lighthouse at Cape Recife (the Westerly point of Algoa Bay), and southern right whales from viewing points along the coast. Boat-based whale watching (and dolphin watching) is also a popular tourist attraction in a number of other coastal towns in South Africa, such as Plettenberg Bay, where the industry is linked to conservation and education efforts through Plettenberg Bay-based volunteer marine conservation organisations. Plettenberg Bay is visited by southern right whales in the winter months and humpback whales in the summer months. Bryde's whales are resident throughout the year. The other famous centre for whale watching is False Bay. Tours leave Gordon's Bay and follow the coast around the bay. Species include southern right whales, humpback whales and Bryde's whales. Orcas are present during the winter months. Visitors include pilot whales and pygmy sperm whales. Many species of dolphin are encountered including Heaviside's dolphins. The same tours include great white sharks at Seal Island and the African Penguin Colony at Simon's Town.

==== Southwest Atlantic – Argentina, Brazil and Uruguay ====
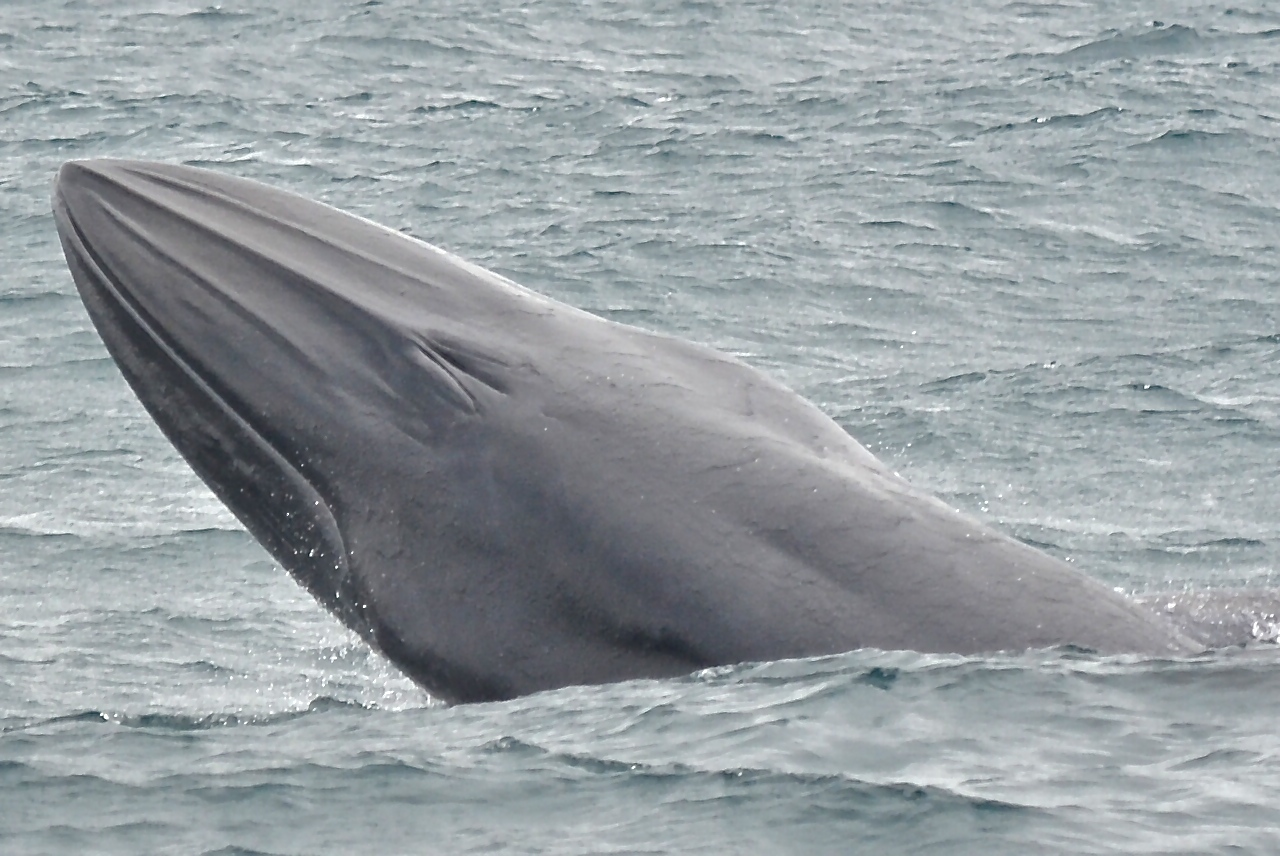
Bryde's whale breaching in Baia de Castelhanos, north of São Paulo, Brazil

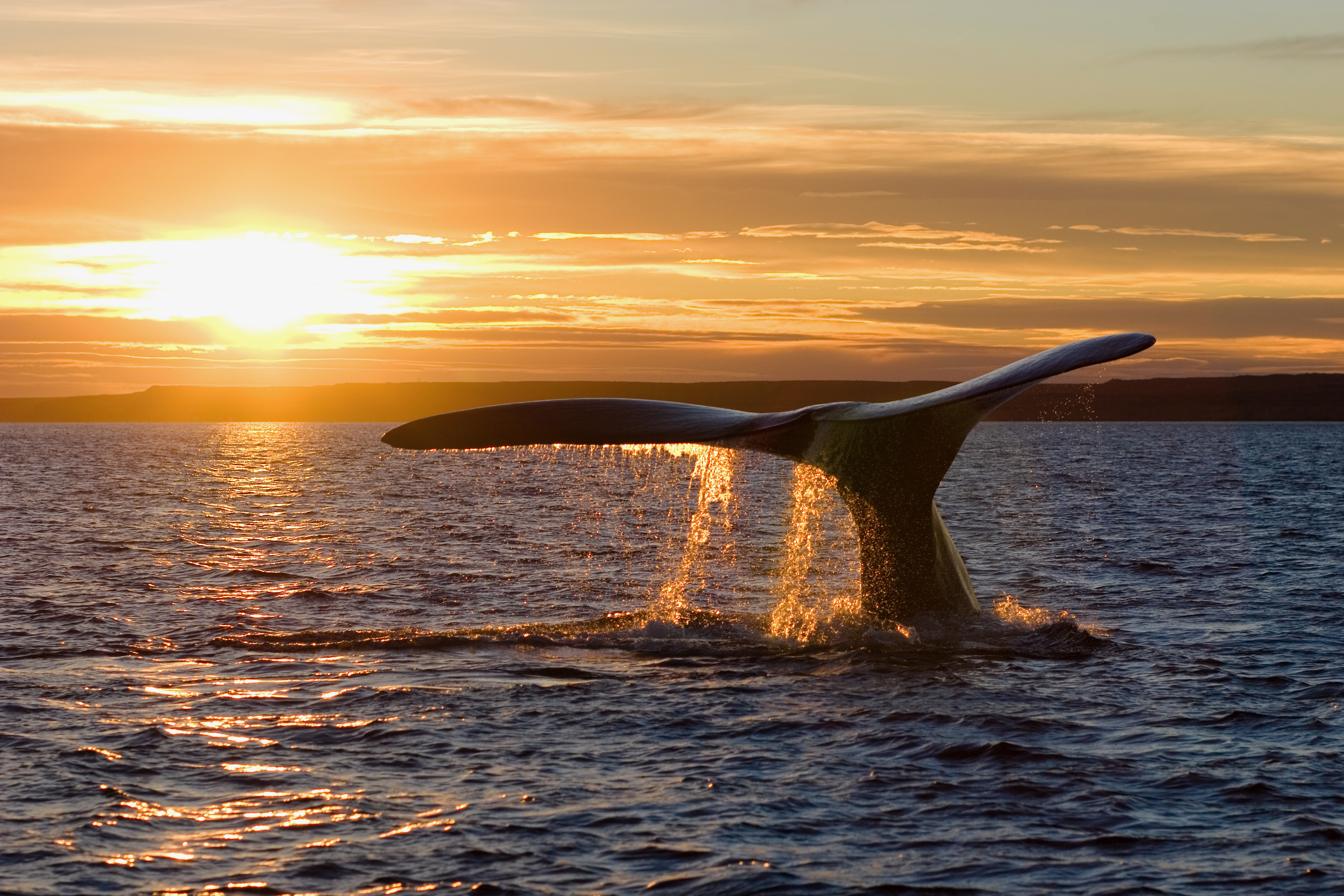
Southern right whale fluking in Golfo Nuevo, Peninsula Valdés, Argentina.

In Brazil, humpbacks are observed off Salvador in Bahia State and at the National Marine Park of Abrolhos during their breeding season in austral winter and spring. Likewise, southern right whales are observed from shore in Santa Catarina State and Espírito Santo during the same season. Mother/calf pairs can come as close to shore as 30 meters (about 100 feet). Income from whale watching bolsters coastal communities and has made the township of Imbituba, the Brazilian "whale capital".

In Argentina, Península Valdés in Patagonia hosts from April to October one of the largest breeding population of southern right whales, which increased steadily from 1,200 breeding individuals in 1986 to 2500 in 2001 and 4000 in 2015. The region contains six natural reserves, and is considered to be one of the premier whale watching destinations in the world, particularly around the town of Puerto Pirámides and the city of Puerto Madryn, as the whales come within 200 m (660 ft) of the main beach and are the main ecotourism attraction in Patagonia. This industry expanded enormously in the 1990s, from 5,214 tourists in 1987 to 96,436 in 2004, and was largely unregulated until 2008. At that point the provincial government adopted a Code of Conduct, developed in conjunction with tourism operators and the IWC, which limited the operating area of boats and banned whale watching until 1 September each year. Tourist numbers have remained steady at about 100,000 a year, most coming in September or early October to watch mother-calf pairs.

In Uruguay, southern right whales are observable from the beach in two coastal departments – Maldonado and Rocha – from June to November. The points where most sightings in Maldonado are made are Punta Colorada, Punta Negra, Playa Mansa and Punta Salinas in Punta del Este, and in Rocha off La Paloma and La Pedrera beaches. Legislators have designated the country's territorial waters as a sanctuary for whales and dolphins. It is illegal to be within 300 metres of a whale.

==== Northeast Atlantic ====
Tidal straits, inlets, lagoons, and varying water temperatures provide diverse habitats for multiple cetacean species. Substantial numbers live off the coasts of the United Kingdom, Ireland, Iceland, Scandinavia, Portugal, Spain, and France. Commercial car ferries crossing the Bay of Biscay from Britain and Ireland to Spain and France often pass by enormous blue whales and much smaller harbor porpoises. Land-based tours can often view these animals.

Off the south coast of Ireland, humpback whales and fin whales are regularly seen on organized whale watching trips between July and February. Species seen all year include minke whales, orcas, harbour porpoises, and common, bottlenose, and Risso's dolphins. There is also a resident group of bottlenose dolphins in the Shannon Estuary which attracts tourists all year round. Chanonry Point is one of the best spots in the UK to view bottlenose dolphins. The dolphins are visible from the shore, particularly on an incoming tide when they play and fish in the strong currents. Other wildlife, including porpoises and grey seals, can also regularly be spotted.

In Northern Norway (Nordland and Troms counties) orcas are visible in the Vestfjorden, Tysfjorden, Ofotfjorden and Andfjorden as the herring gathers in the fjords to stay over the winter and off the Lofoten islands during the summer. At Andenes on Andøya in Vesterålen and around Krøttøya in Troms, sperm whales can be observed year round, summer whale watching trips occur from May till September, winter trips with killer whales and humpback whales are offered from October till April. Tromsø also offers whale watching for sperm and other whales. The continental shelf Eggakanten and deep water where the sperm whales congregate, is very close to shore, beginning only 7,000 meters (23,000 ft) from the Andenes harbour.

In Portugal whale watching is available in the Algarve. Lagos and Portimão are the most important whale-watching places. The species observed in this area are the fin, killer, and pilot whale, and the bottlenose, common, and striped dolphin.

In the middle of the Northeast Atlantic, around the Madeira, the Azores and the Cape Verde archipelagos, whale watching is on the increase and popular due to more protection and education. One of the most common whales in these regions is the sperm whale, especially groups of calving females. With the decline of whaling in the Azores in the early 1970s in the islands, many of the communities of the archipelago involved in whaling (including villages and towns, specifically on the islands of Faial, Terceira, São Miguel and Pico) were transformed into hubs for whale watching services (that followed the migratory tracts during the summer), while older buildings and factories were re-purposed into museums.

In Spain whale watching is available along the Strait of Gibraltar, the Canary Islands, and in the Bay of Biscay. Tarifa is the most important whale watching town in the Strait of Gibraltar; this gateway to the Mediterranean Sea is also a central point in between the colder waters to the North and the tropical waters off of Africa: a good route for migrating cetaceans. The species observed in this area are the bottlenose, common, and striped dolphin, and the pilot, sperm, fin, and killer whale. In the Canary Islands it is possible to see these and others, such as the blue, beaked, false killer, and Bryde's whale, and the Atlantic spotted, rough-toothed, and Risso's dolphin.

In Iceland it is possible to see whales in Eyjafjörður, Breiðafjörður, Skjálfandi and Faxaflói. The towns offering whale watching are Dalvík, Hauganes, Húsavík, Akureyri, Hólmavík, Grundarfjörður and Reykjavík. Most common are the minke, humpback, blue, killer, and sperm whale, as well as the white-beaked dolphin, and the harbour porpoise.

==== Northwest Atlantic ====
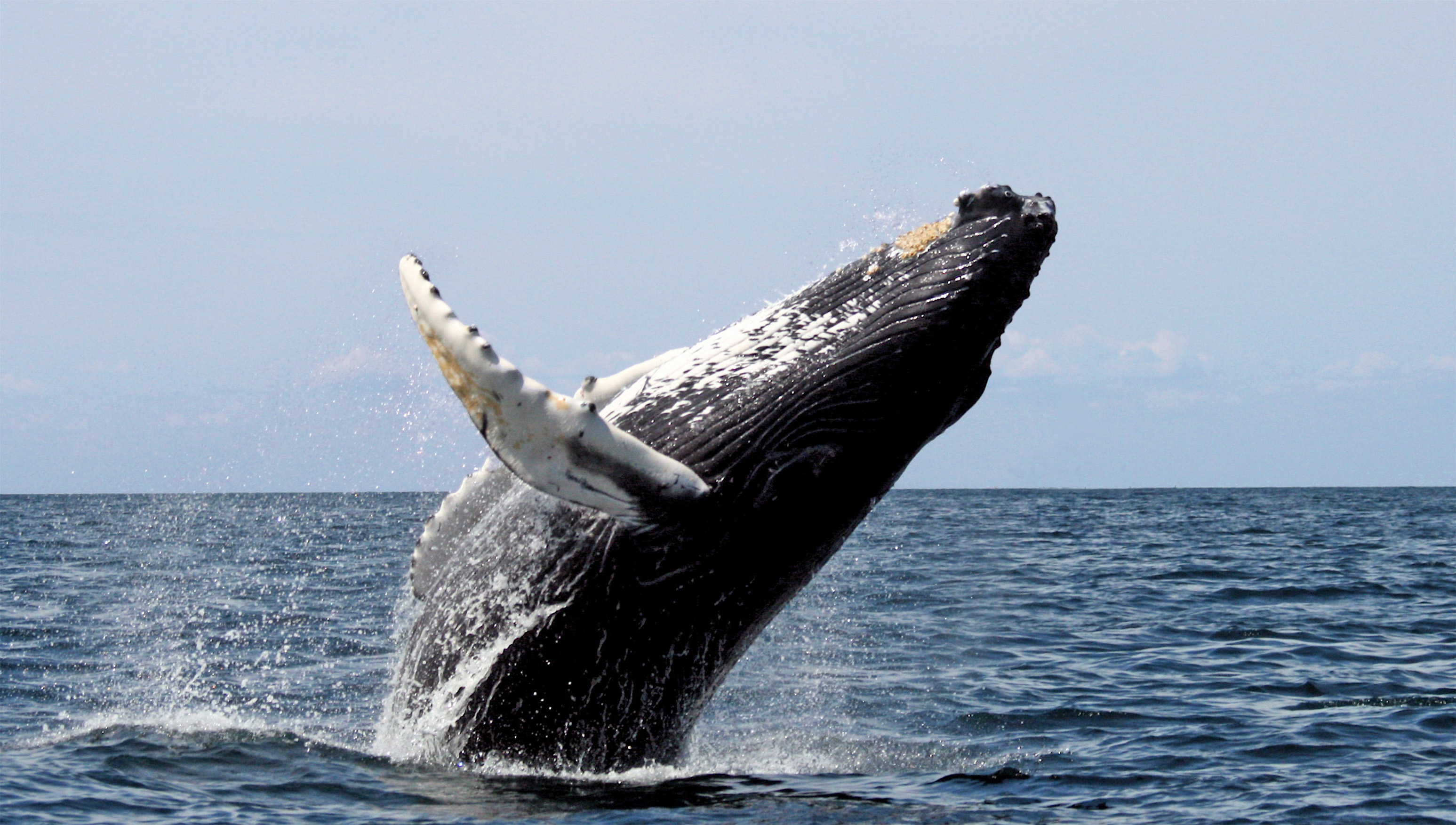
A humpback breaching in the Stellwagen Bank National Marine Sanctuary, Massachusetts. This is a behavior commonly seen in the area.

In New England and off the east coast of Long Island in the United States, the whale watching season typically takes place from about mid-spring through October, depending both on weather and precise location. It is here that the humpback whale, fin whale, minke whale, and the very endangered/heavily protected North Atlantic right whale are often observed. For generations, areas like the Gulf of Maine and Stellwagen Bank National Marine Sanctuary (part of the inner waters formed by Cape Cod's hooked shape) have been important feeding grounds for these species: to this day a very large portion of the waters off the Eastern Seaboard are rich in sand lance and other nutritious treats for mothers to teach their calves to feed on.

In the past this area was the US whaling industry's capital, particularly Nantucket, an island just off the coast of Massachusetts. Though whaling has been banned for many years, and strict laws prohibit molestation of these large wild mammals, it is not unknown for the whales to approach whale watching boats uninvited, particularly curious calves and juveniles: it is not unknown in particular, for example, for juvenile humpbacks to approach the boat and spyhop to get a better look at the humans aboard. In recent years it is also not uncommon to see these animals playing and feeding in harbors, including New York City or Boston where fish species of interest to the whales have lately returned in astonishing numbers. As of 2011, an expert from Cornell University has recorded the vocalizations of six whale species including the humpback, the fin whale, and the massive blue whale within close proximity of the Verrazzano–Narrows Bridge in the lower portion of New York Harbor and there is at least one company offering marine life tours out of The Rockaway Peninsula in Queens. Due to these increasingly frequent visits, new laws address the safety of boaters, commercial fishermen, and the whales themselves: off the coast of Boston, for example, cargo vessels must slow down to protect the much slower North Atlantic right whale and there is talk of erecting an apparatus for the much more heavily trafficked waters surrounding New York City that can warn boats of a whale's presence and location so as to avoid accidentally striking the animal. Because of the relative diversity of whales and dolphins within easy access of shore, cetacean research takes place at Woods Hole Oceanographic Institute, and the Riverhead Foundation among other centers.

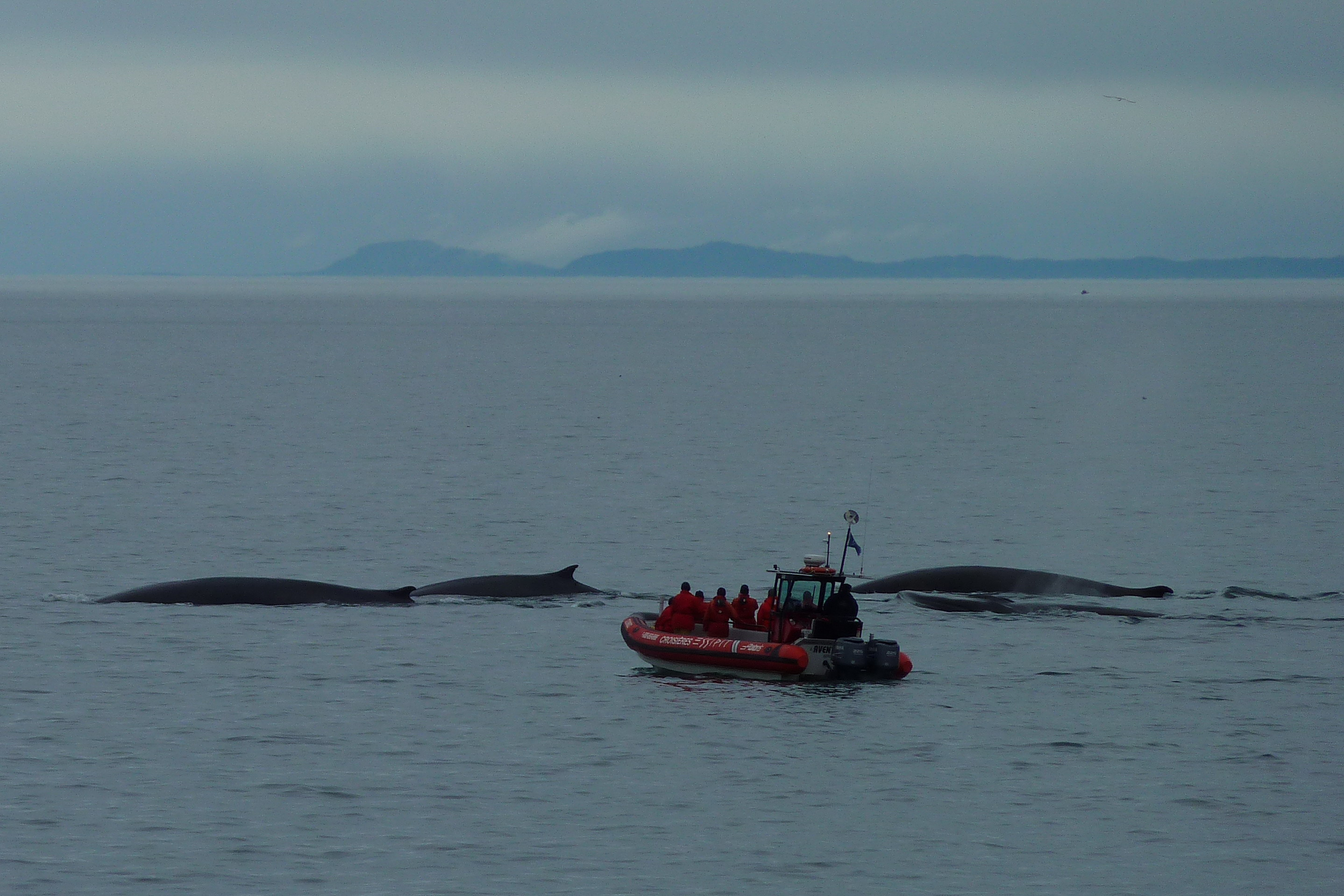
Estuary of St. Lawrence River, whale watching near Tadoussac, Quebec

Eastern Canada has many whale watching tours in the estuary and gulf of St. Laurence River, in Newfoundland and Labrador, Quebec, Nova Scotia or New Brunswick. Twenty-two species of whales and dolphins frequent the waters of Newfoundland and Labrador, although the most common are the humpback, minke, fin, Beluga and killer whales. Another popular whale-watching area is at Tadoussac, Quebec, where Belugas favor the extreme depth and admixture of cold fresh water from the Saguenay River into the inland end of the Gulf of St. Lawrence. Humpbacks, minkes, fin and blue whales are also frequently seen off Tadoussac. The Bay of Fundy is an equally important feeding ground for large baleen whales and dozens of other creatures of the sea; it shares a population of migrating humpbacks with America and is a known summer nursery for mother right whales with calves.

On the east coast of the United States, Virginia Beach, Virginia whale watching is a winter activity from the end of December until the middle of March. Fin, humpback, and right whales are seen off the Virginia Beach coast on whale watching boat trips run by the Virginia Aquarium and Marine Science Center. Sightings are mostly of juveniles who stay near the mouth of the Chesapeake Bay where food is plentiful, while the adults continue to the Caribbean to mate. "Mom" and "Dad" pick up their offspring on the way back north where the whole family summers.

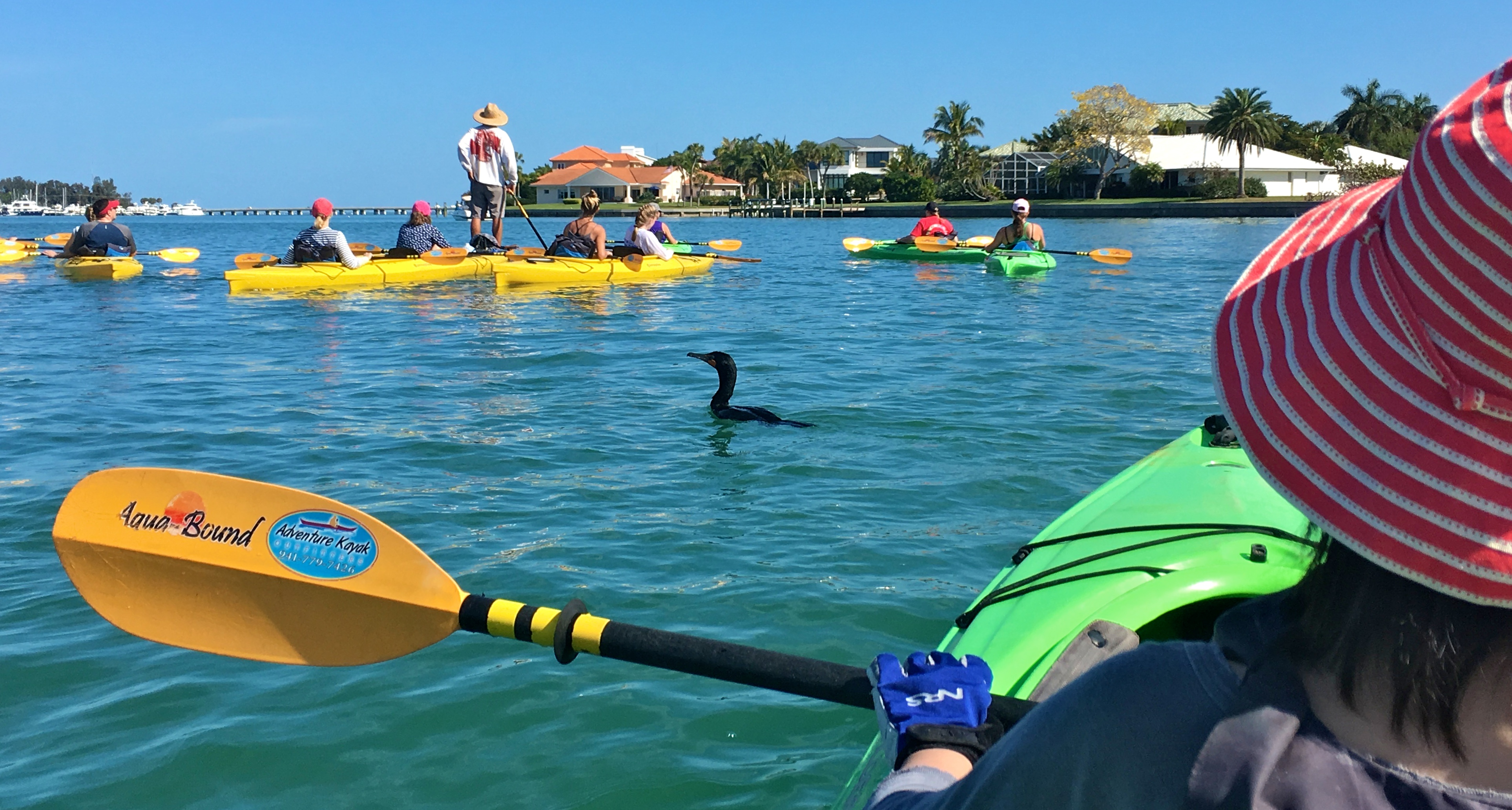
Ecotour guide stands on a kayak spotting dolphins and manatees, around Lido Key, Florida

Ecotourism based on kayak trips is gaining in popularity in warm-water vacation destinations such as Sarasota Keys. Guided kayak trips take kayakers on a tour of the local ecosystem. Kayakers can watch dolphins breach and manatees eat sea grass, in shallow bay water.

The waters surrounding Virginia are also a known migration corridor for the endangered North Atlantic right whale: Pregnant females must pass through this area around December to reach their birthing grounds down the coast in Georgia and Florida. For these reasons the waters between the Delmarva Peninsula and the barrier islands that stretch southwards towards northern Florida must be monitored every winter and spring as mothers give birth to their calves, nurse them, and then ready themselves and their younglings to return north for the cooler waters near New England and Canada.

==== Caribbean ====
About 25 species are observed in the waters of the Caribbean Sea, such as humpback whales, sperm whales, beaked whales and many other small cetaceans. Humpback whale migration season, between January and April, is a growing tourist attractor to the region, particularly to the Dominican Republic and Puerto Rico, with the Mona Passage being located in the heart of the route of migration. Principal whale watching activities in the Dominican Republic are done in Samaná Bay, a very well-known breeding ground for humpbacks. Whale watching as a form of tourist was first established in Santa Bárbara de Samaná in 1985, with the nearby Navidad and Silver Banks being the most important location for humpback whale calving in the Caribbean region. In Puerto Rico, the western town of Rincón is the main port of departure for whale watching tours to the Mona Passage during migration season.

Caribwhale and the Caribbean Whale Watch Association include operators engaged in sustainable whale watching activity, as well as experts, conservationists and research groups, such as the International Fund for Animal Welfare, Dalhousie University and Association Evasion Tropicale. The oceanic trenches of Dominica also attract breeding sperm whales and visitors seeking to observe this species. Other whale watching destinations include the Turks and Caicos Islands, Saint Lucia, the U.S. Virgin Islands and Grenada.

==== Northern Indian Ocean ====
On the South and East Coasts of Sri Lanka and The Maldives, the industry is growing. During winter and summer, pygmy blue and sperm whales cross the southern tip of the island, migrating to the warmer waters of Southeast Asia. Many pygmy blue whales can be seen at Dondra point in Sri Lanka, accessed through the Mirissa or Weligama harbour. Whale-watching tours can be arranged in Sri Lanka. Blue whales and some types of dolphins can be seen in the sea of Mirissa in Sri Lanka. Many sightings have been reported from November to April.

==== Northern Mediterranean Sea ====
In the Pelagos Sanctuary for Mediterranean Marine Mammals, located in the waters of Italy, France and Monaco, there are eight species of marine mammals residents, most of them all year. Frequent summer excursions depart from the ports of Genoa and Imperia, in Liguria, Northern Italy.

=== Pacific Ocean ===
==== East Pacific –Colombia, Ecuador and Panama ====
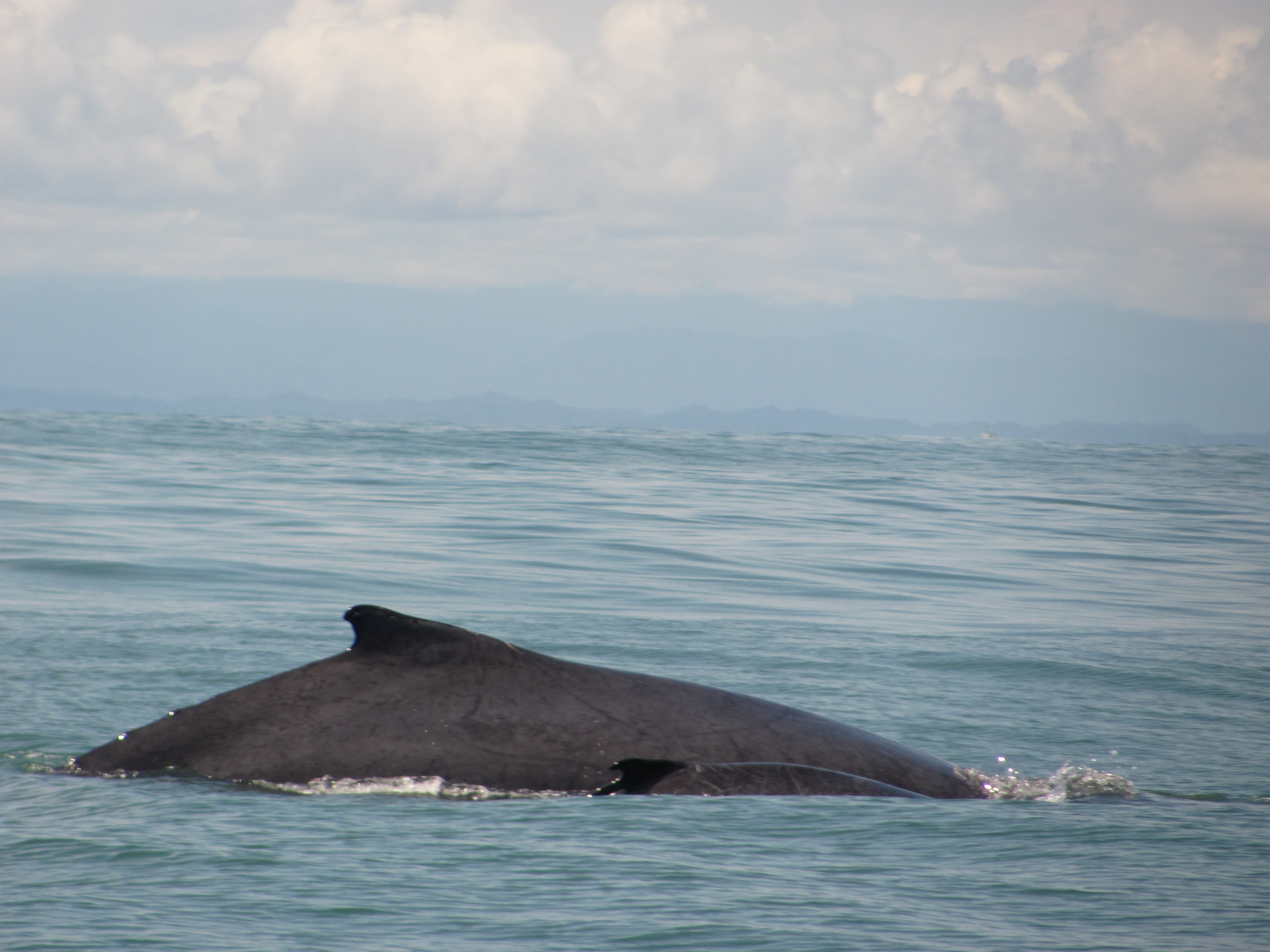
Humpback whale species in Uramba Bahía Málaga National Natural Park, Cauca Valley, Colombia, considered the favorite place for whales give birth to their young, making it a tourist destination

In Colombia, the towns of Bahía Solano and Nuquí are visited by a large number of Humpback whales from late July to the beginning of October. In southern Costa Rica, Marino Ballena National Park has two seasons when whales visit.

In Panama, the Pearl Islands archipelago receive an estimated 300 humpbacks whale from late June to late November. These had become now the main attraction for whale watching tours starting in Panama City. In the Gulf of Chiriqui, the World Heritage Site of Coiba Island National Park and the islands near the town of Boca Chica are offering opportunities for whale watching. Isla Iguana near Pedasi is now a popular destination for whale watchers. Several foundations train local community members to perform as guide and captains for whale watching tours.

In Ecuador, from June to September, there are many sites from which large groups of humpback whales can be seen, including Isla de la Plata (AKA Little Galapagos) and Salinas, at the tip of the Santa Elena Peninsula.

==== Northeast Pacific –Mexico and United States ====
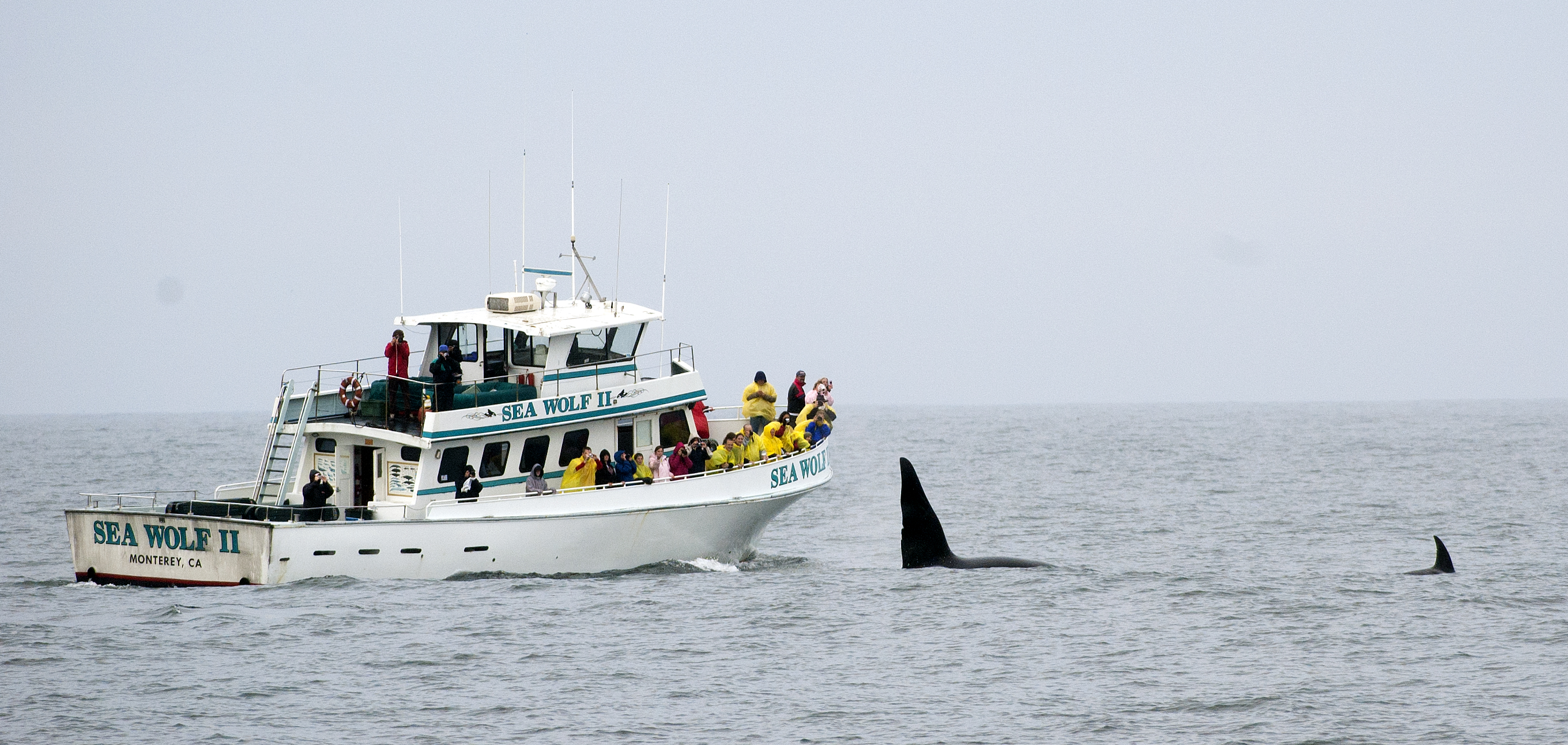
Watching orcas in Monterey Bay.

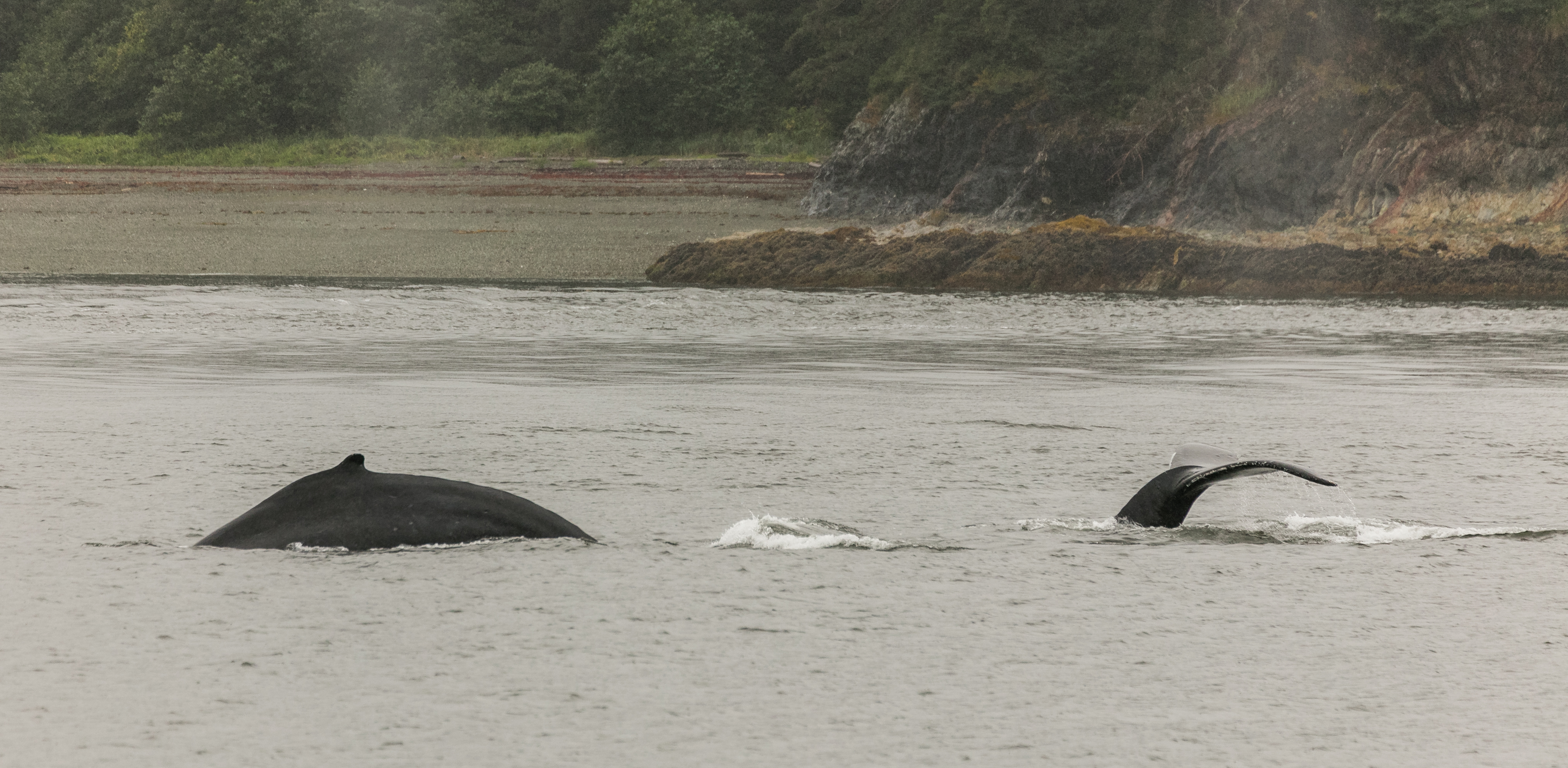
Humpback whales watching (Megaptera novaeangliae), Juneau, Alaska, United States.

On the West Coast of Canada and the United States, excellent whale watching can be found in Alaska (summer), British Columbia, and the San Juan Islands/Puget Sound in Washington, where whales are sighted from shore nearly every day, year-round. Three types of orca pods can be observed in the Northeast Pacific: resident, transient, and offshore killer whales.

On the Oregon Coast, several whale species, especially gray whales, may be seen year-round, and the state trains volunteers to assist tourists in the winter months, during whale migration season. In California, good whale-watching can be found year-round on the Southern California coast. During the winter and spring (December–May), gray whales can be seen from shore on their annual migration (the best spot being Point Vicente), while blue whales are often seen between July and October. Fin whales, minke whales, orcas, and various species of dolphins can be seen year-round. In spring, summer, and fall at the Farallon Islands off San Francisco, one may see humpbacks, grays, and blue whales.

In Mexico, the various lagoons of Baja California Sur become breeding habitat for gray whales in February and March. Humpback whales can be seen off the southern tip of Baja California, and off Puerto Vallarta in Jalisco on the west coast of Mexico, and Barra de Potosí on the south coast of Mexico in the state of Guerrero. A number of towns in Mexico celebrate the whale's arrival with festivals such as Guerrero Negro, in the first half of February and the port of San Blas on 24 and 25 February.

In late March 2021, a 70-foot (21 m) blue whale was spotted near the Orange County, California coastline. These mammals are typically seen in summer months, but this blue whale was spotted out of season, heading north, close to the Balboa Pier and Newport Beach shoreline.

==== Central Pacific –Hawaii ====
Each winter 4,000 to 10,000 North Pacific humpback whales migrate from Alaska to Hawaii. Whale watching is possible in and around the Hawaiian Islands Humpback Whale National Marine Sanctuary with January and February generally experiencing the highest sighting rates.

==== West Pacific –East and Southeast Asia ====
Many countries in Asia have large whale watching industries. In 2008 the largest, in terms of number of tourists, were mainland China, Taiwan and Japan. India, Cambodia, Indonesia, the Philippines and the Maldives also have dolphin watching and some whale watching. China's dolphin watching is almost entirely focussed on Sanniang Bay in Guangxi. Taiwan has several whale watching ports on its east coast. Japan has a range of whale and dolphin watching businesses on all main islands and Okinawa, Zamami, Ogasawara, Mikura-jima and Miyake-jima.

In the Philippines, over thirty species of whales and dolphins can be observed around Pamilacan in Central Visayas, Davao Gulf, the northern coast of the province-island Babuyan Islands in Batanes, Pasaleng Bay, and Malampaya Sound, Palawan. The Visayas is particularly known area for dolphin sightings, and is home to one of the larger populations of the Fraser's dolphin in the world. Dolphin species in the Visayas are attracted to fish lures and to commercial fishing operations. In the northernmost province of Batanes, at least 12 species of whales and dolphins has been sighted, making it the single location in the country with the highest cetacean diversity. There seems to be no specific whale watching season in the Philippines, although the calmer waters of the summer season typically provides the best conditions. Some populations, like those of the Irrawaddy dolphin, Bryde's whale, and humpback whales in Batanes, appear migratory. Other populations have yet to be studied. Some former coastal whaling communities in the Philippines have also started to generate whale watching income.

==== Southeast Pacific –Chile and Peru ====
In the Gulf of Corcovado and the waters of Guaitecas Archipelago a variety of whales and dolphins can be been spotted, including: Peale's dolphins, black dolphins, bottlenose dolphins, humpback whales, minke whales and killer whales. The Gulf of Corcovado is "arguably the largest feeding and nursing ground for blue whales [...] in the entire Southern Hemisphere". All of this makes Guaitecas Archipelago a privileged place for whale watching. In the localities of Piñihuil, Quellón and Melinka local fishermen offer whale watching tours.

==== Southwest Pacific – New Zealand and Australia ====
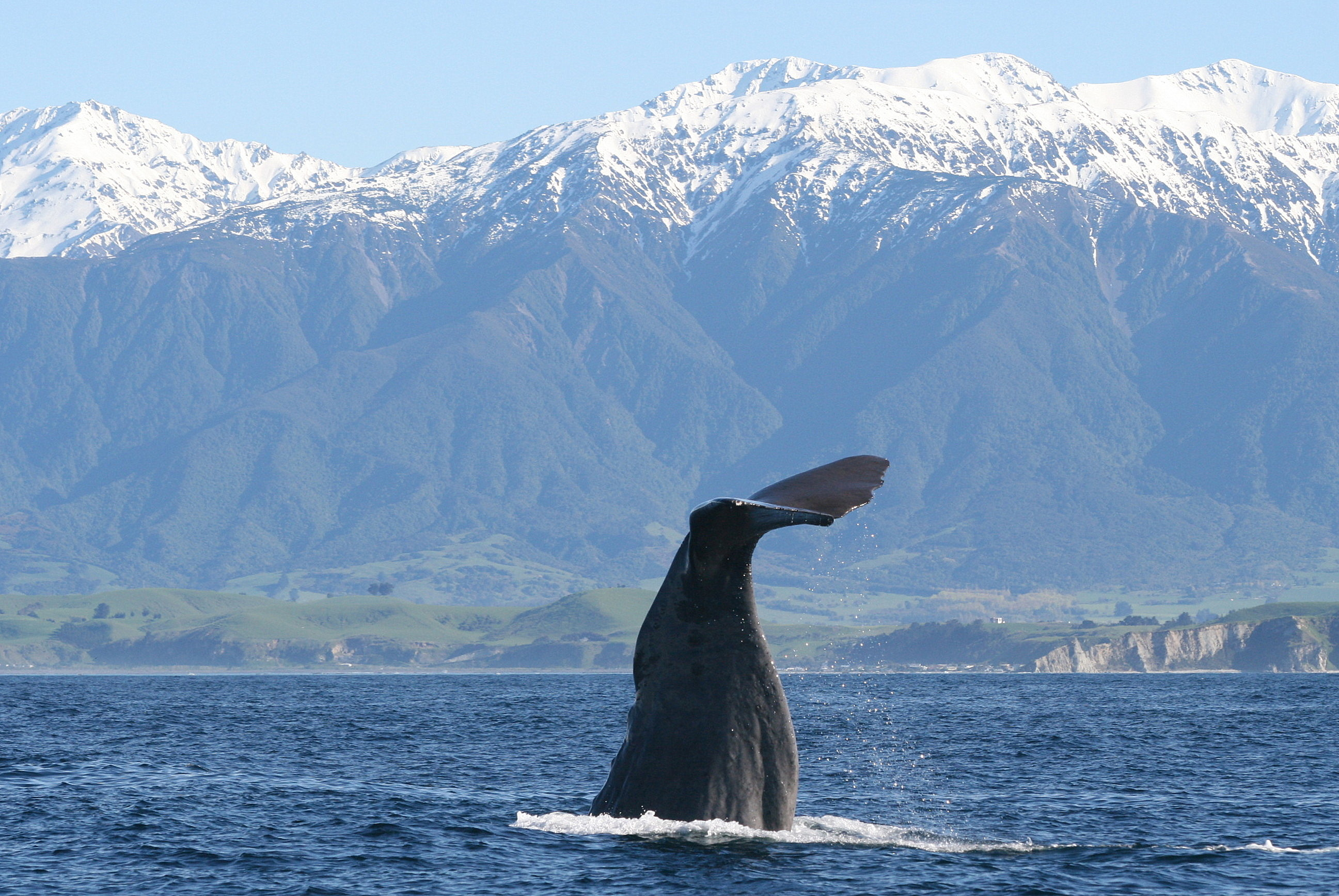
Diving sperm whale near the coast of Kaikōura, New Zealand

Kaikōura in New Zealand is a world-famous whale-watching site. The sea around Kaikōura supports an abundance of sea life, with the town's income stemming largely from the tourism generated from whale watching and swimming with or around dolphins. Recently the sperm whale watching at Kaikōura has developed rapidly and now it is an industry leader, arguably the most developed in the world. The town went into recession after the collapse of whaling in New Zealand. Its recent development has been used to advocate the benefits of watching whales instead of hunting them.

Further north, the Bay of Plenty has emerged as a significant hub for marine ecotourism. In Tauranga, commercial wildlife cruises operate from the harbor and Mount Maunganui, leveraging the region's unique coastal geography to observe migratory humpback whales and orcas. The area is notable for its diverse marine ecosystem; distinct from southern regions, the warmer local waters provide seasonal opportunities to spot rarer pelagic species, including leatherback turtles, manta rays, and sunfish (mola mola).

Further north, the Hauraki Gulf Marine Park near Auckland serves as a critical feeding ground, notably hosting a population of Bryde's whales alongside common dolphins, which supports year-round boat-based ecotourism.

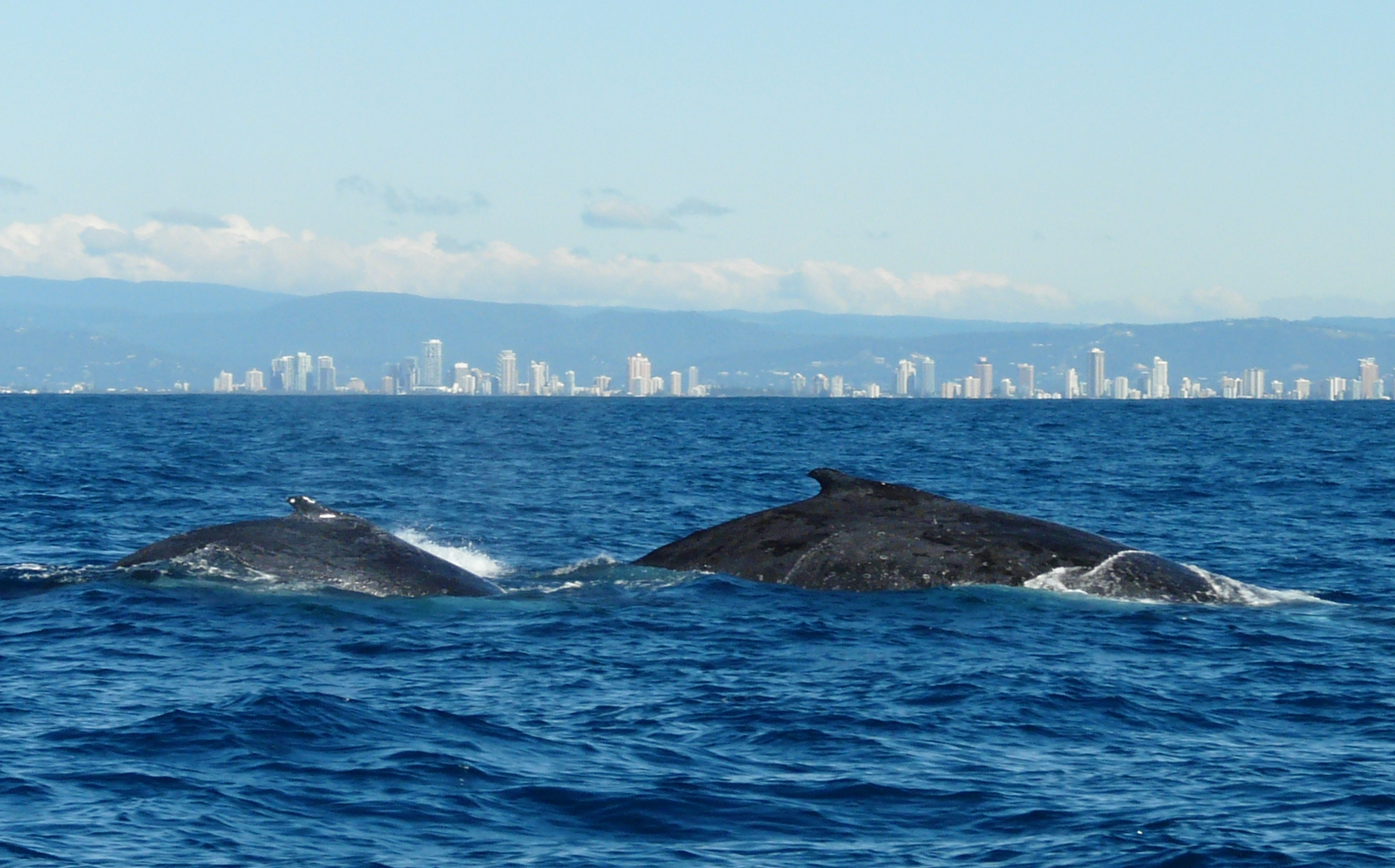
A couple of humpback whales spotted off the Gold Coast, Queensland

The Sunshine Coast and Hervey Bay (where the whales stay and rest before migrating) in Queensland, Australia offer reliable whale watching conditions for southern humpback whales from the end of June through to the end of November each year. Whale numbers and activity have increased markedly in recent years. Sydney, Eden, Port Stephens, Narooma and Byron Bay in New South Wales are other popular hot spots for tours from May to November.

Southern right whales are seen June–August along the south coast of Australia. They are often readily viewed from the coast around Encounter Bay near Victor Harbor and up to a hundred at a time may be seen from the cliff tops at the head of the Great Australian Bight near Yalata. See also Whaling in Australia.

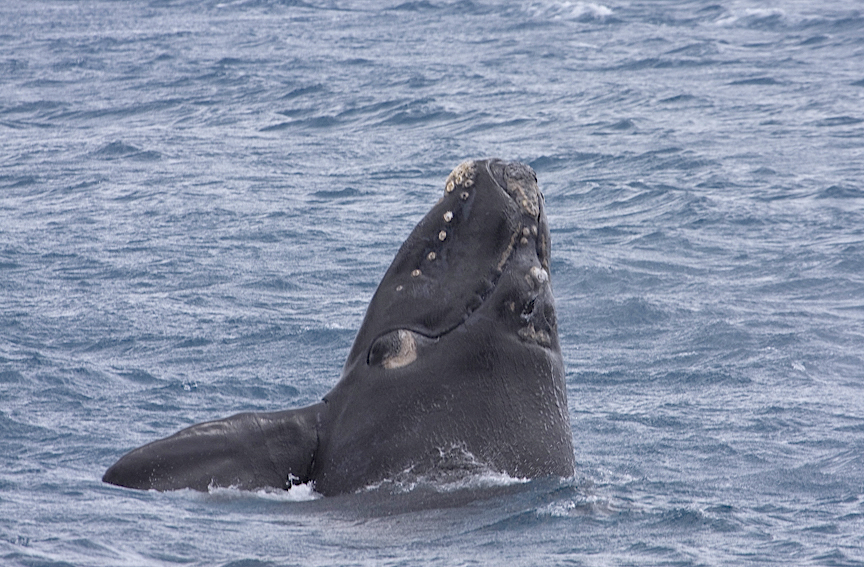
Southern right whale, offshore from Cheynes, Western Australia

In Western Australia, whales are watched near Cape Naturaliste in the south-east Indian Ocean and at Cape Leeuwin where the Indian and Southern Oceans meet.

In the Southern Ocean there are many spots to see whales, both from land or aboard ship. Albany on the south coast of Western Australia the town where the last land based whaling station in the southern hemisphere was located is now home to a thriving whale watching industry. In Victoria a popular site is Logan's Beach at Warrnambool, as well as in the waters off Port Fairy and Portland. In Tasmania whales can be seen all along the east coast and even on the River Derwent. In South Australia whales are watched in the Great Australian Bight Marine Park areas and closer to Adelaide at Victor Harbor.

In eastern Australia, whale watching occurs in many spots along the Pacific coast. From headlands, whales may often be seen making their migration south. At times, whales even make it into Sydney Harbour.

New South Wales National Parks and Wildlife took an active role in 2010 during the peak southern whale watching season between May and November with the launch of its whale watching site.

== Whaling and whale watching ==
Only three nations (Japan, Iceland, and Norway) still undertake commercial whaling. Some other nations practise aboriginal subsistence whaling: Denmark (in Greenland), Russia (Chukotka), St Vincent and the Grenadines (Bequia) the United States (Alaska), and Canada. All also have whale watching industries: Iceland had the fastest-growing whale watching industry in the world between 1994 and 1998. One theory is that by supporting and promoting whale-watching in whaling countries like Norway, Iceland and Japan, whaling will decrease, as whales prove more valuable alive than dead. Corkeron has called this a zombie idea, meaning something that "should have been killed off long ago, given the available evidence that it is wrong, and yet it just will not die." In fact, whaling and whale watching continue to coexist in these countries, although with some tensions: Icelandic whale watching operators are among the most opposed to Iceland continuing commercial whaling.

=== Japan ===
Erich Hoyt and other conservationists have argued that a whale is worth more alive and watched than dead. The goal is to persuade their governments to curtail whaling activities. This debate continues at the International Whaling Commission, particularly since whaling countries complain that the scarcity of whale meat and other products has increased their value. However, the whale meat market has collapsed, and in Japan the government subsidizes the market through distribution in schools and other promotion. In 1997, 2,000 tonnes of whale meat were sold for $30m – a 10-tonne minke whale would thus have been worth $150,000. There is no agreement as to how to value a single animal although its true value is probably much higher. However, it is clear from most coastal communities that are involved in whale watching that profits can be made and are more horizontally distributed throughout the community than if the animals were killed by the whaling industry.

- There have been disputes and skirmishes between whale watching operators and whalers in the nation. For example, whaling was operated right in front of watching vessels, causing malaise among domestic and international passengers on board, and domestic disputes spread on the Internet in Nemuro Strait in 2007. Local tour operators confirmed that targeted species for hunting such as Baird's beaked whales and Dall's porpoises are known to disappear or have become harder to approach in the seasons of whaling operations in the area. Recent notable declines and disappearances (or abandoning of historical habitats) of minke and Baird's beaked whales in coastal waters caused by commercial and scientific whaling that have been operated in wide ranges off the eastern half of Honshu and Hokkaido especially off Abashiri, Gulf of Sendai, and along the coast of Chiba, caused dramatic decreases in sightings of both species in many areas, enough for whalers to be forced to change their operating ranges, and a watching operator in Muroran claimed that whaling affected the profits of the operator due to serious declines and low rates of successful minke sightings in the area. Hunting of Baird's beaked whales in Sea of Japan has ceased in recent decades, and the whales have been said to have become more friendly during this period; however, commercial whaling was resumed in Sea of Japan and caused concerns among cetacean conservationists.
- The first whale watching in Japan was conducted in Bonin Islands in 1998 by a group called "Geisharen 鯨者連" which was formed by groups of domestic and international people including both domestic and international celebrities and notable cetacean researchers and conservationists such as Roger Payne, Erich Hoyt, Richard Oliver, Jim Darling, John Ford, Kyusoku Iwamoto (cartoonist), Hutoushiki Ueki (science writer), Nobuyuki Miyazaki (head chief of the Atmosphere and Ocean Research Institute of The University of Tokyo), Nobuaki Mochizuki (one of the world's first whale photographers to record a North Pacific right whale underwater in 1990 in Bonin Islands), and Junko Sakuma (freelancer). During this time until before the group reach the destination, the Ministry of Agriculture, Forestry and Fisheries (Japan) and other groups and anonymous individuals watched the group's movements and tried to pressure them not to conduct the tour. Prior to this movement, those who claimed conserving marine mammals including pinnipeds, or individuals who tried to correct illegal and over-extensive hunts (including C. W. Nicol, who was a sympathizer with Japan's whaling industries) or domestic media that have done reporting assignments in Japan had been discriminated. These include a former fisherman who was ostracized from the community, later to become a whale-watching operator. Several other tours have been operated by former whalers or dolphin hunters in places such as Abashiri and Muroto.

=== Iceland ===
Upon the resumption of whaling in Iceland in August 2003, pro-whaling groups, such as fishermen who argue that increased stocks of whales deplete fish populations, suggested that sustainable whaling and whale watching could live side by side. Whale watching lobbyists, such as Húsavík Whale Museum curator Asbjorn Bjorgvinsson, counter that the most inquisitive whales, which approach boats very closely and provide much of the entertainment on whale-watching trips, will be the first to be taken. Pro-whaling organisations such as the High North Alliance on the other hand, claim that some whale-watching companies in Iceland are surviving only because they receive funding from anti-whaling organizations. In 2020, Iceland ceased whaling activities due to the COVID-19 pandemic restrictions and decreasing sales to Japan limited the feasibility of a harvest. That same year, whaling for minke whales by the only company targeting domestic markets was permanently ended. A similar decision to halt all whaling activities was made for the summer whaling season of 2021 in light of ongoing pandemic restrictions and steady increases in whale watching tourism.

=== Norway ===
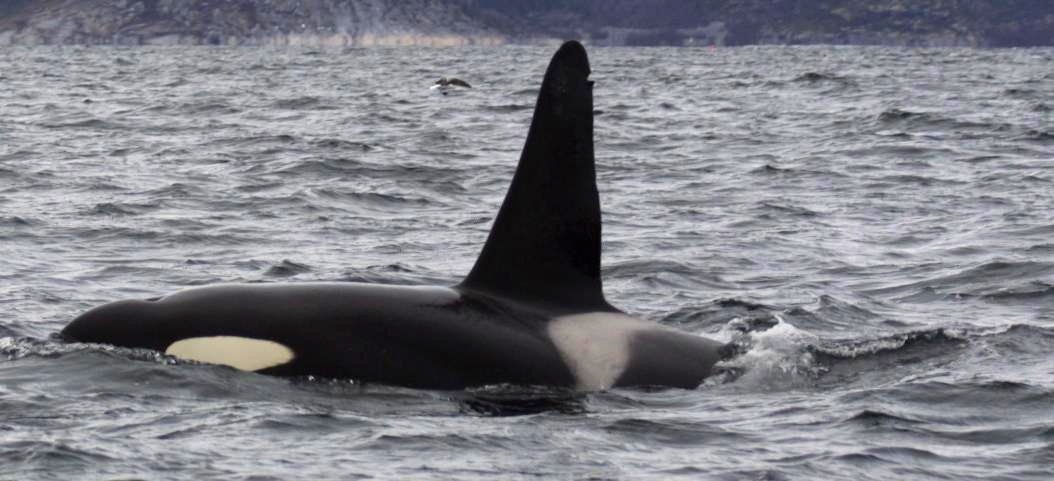
Orca near Tysfjorden, Norway

Enjoyment of observing live cetaceans is rather separated from the domestic whaling industry in Norway; however, whale watching has become a popular national tourist attraction in recent years, especially in Andfjorden (Vesterålen and Troms) and around Tromsø.

- Uniquely, public opinions against whaling showed sudden rises in 2014, when a possibly pregnant minke whale Heiko and a local cetacean researcher Heike Vester who monitors the whale's safety, successfully shook off whaling vessels by taking refuge in the very shallow fjord of Lofoten, where large whales had not been seen for years; this has provided chances for locals to witness cetaceans at close range. Heiko's appearance soon resulted in an increase in interest among locals. As time passed, Heiko attracted more domestic and international interest, which has resulted in greater questioning and opposition to the whaling industry in Norway.

=== Canada ===
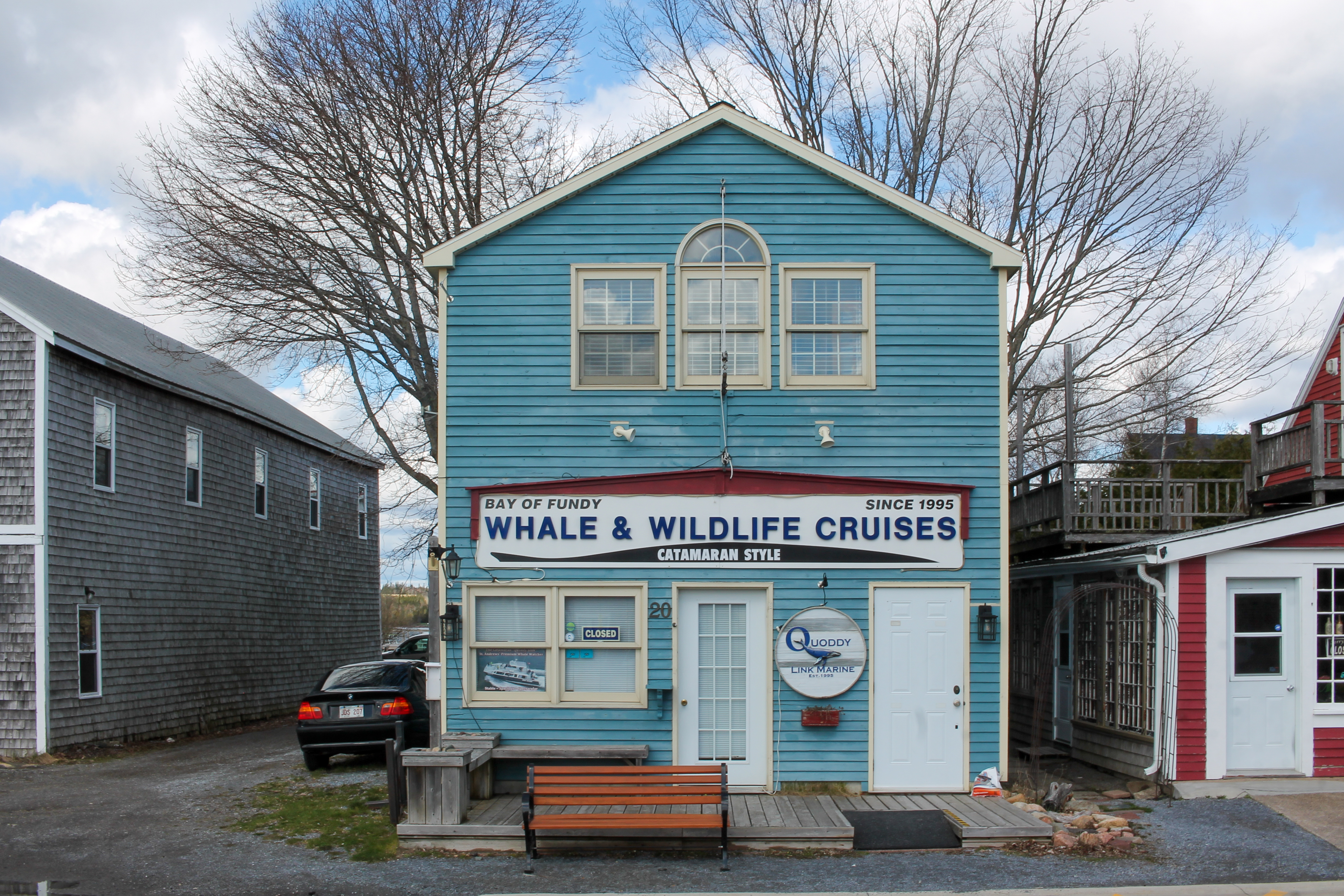
Whale watching business in Saint Andrews, New Brunswick.

Whale watching and hunting take place in different regions of Canada: the former mainly on Atlantic and Pacific coasts, the latter exclusively in the Arctic. Whale watching happens in the Saint Lawrence River, western Hudson's Bay near Churchill, and British Columbia. Hunting takes place in eastern Hudson's Bay (Nunavik, Quebec), Nunavut and the Beaufort Sea. Researchers have suggested the hunting areas would benefit more from whale watching than hunting since hunting takes more resources than it earns. In 2018, Canada implemented new restrictions intended to cut human interactions with whales. Following these rules, all boats must stay farther away from the mammals than before. Some activities, including snorkeling with humpbacks, are banned.

=== Greenland ===
Greenland has small whale watching operations in Disko Bay and Nuuk. Both areas have beluga hunts. There has been controversy over who is allowed to participate in hunts and consume the meat.

=== Russia ===
Russian whale watching involves orcas off the Kamchatka peninsula on the edge of the Sea of Okhotsk. Beluga are hunted in the Sea of Okhotsk as well as farther north. Erich Hoyt of the Whale and Dolphin Conservation Society has identified other places in Russia to develop whale watching.

== See also ==
- Whale surfacing behaviour
