= Erich Hoyt =

American researcher and conservationist (born 1950)

Erich Hoyt OBE
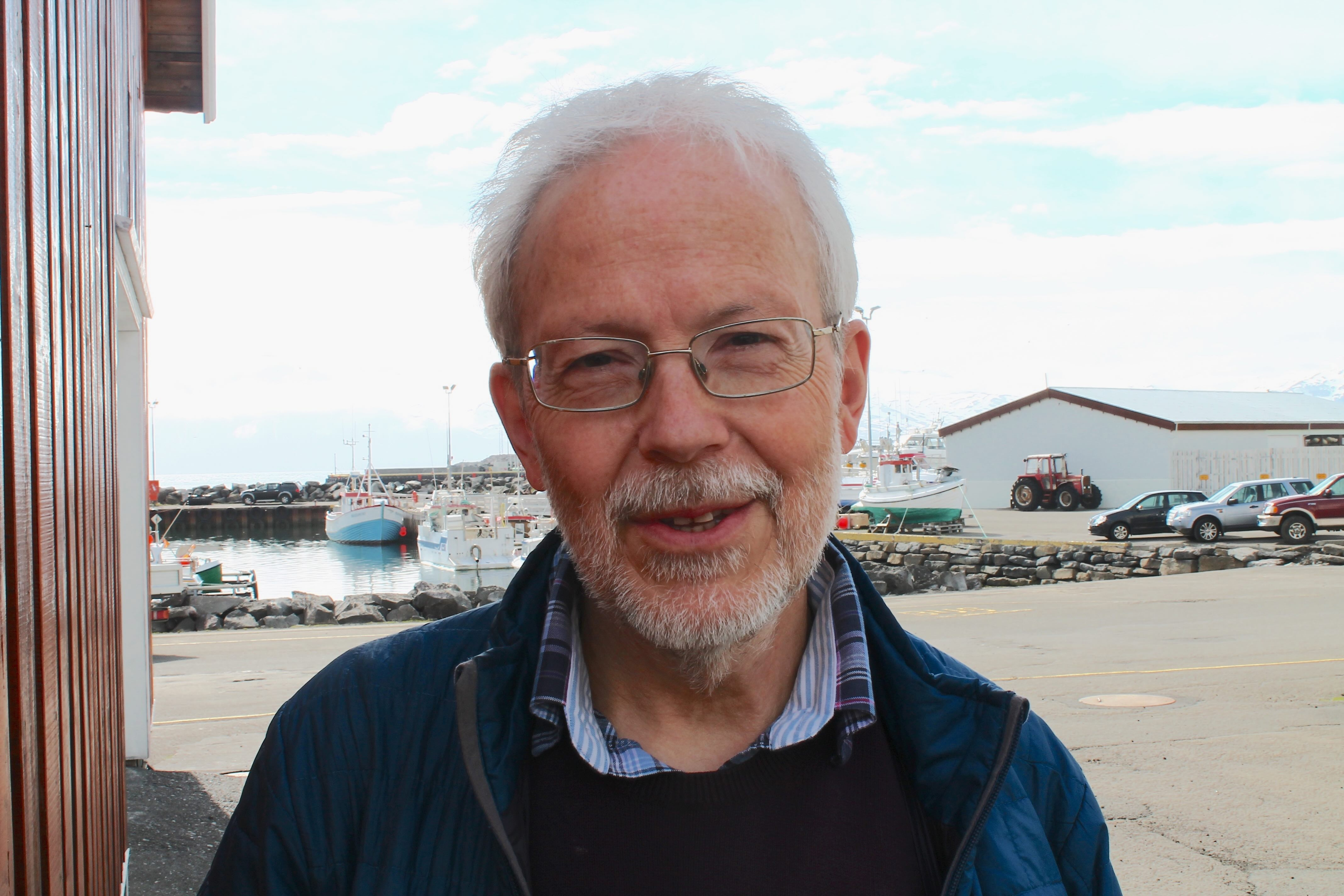
- Hoyt in Iceland
- Born: September 28, 1950 (age 75); Akron, Ohio, U.S.
- Occupations: Author, researcher, conservationist, speaker
- Spouse: Sarah Wedden (1989–present)
- Children: 4
- Writing career
- Language: English
- Years active: 1975–present
- Subjects: Nature, Science, Marine Mammals, Marine Conservation
- Website: erichhoyt.com

(Robert) Erich Hoyt (born September 28, 1950) is a whale and dolphin (cetacean) researcher, conservationist, lecturer and author of 26 books and more than 700 reports, articles and papers. His book Marine Protected Areas for Whales, Dolphins and Porpoises (Earthscan, Taylor & Francis, 2005; 2nd edition, 2011), has been widely reviewed as the "definitive reference of the current extent of cetacean ecosystems-based management" and as "a unique and essential book for anybody interested in the conservation and protection of cetaceans. [This] definitive source on MPAs marine protected areas for cetaceans…will influence the design and management of this important and rapidly developing conservation tool." Choice listed the book as an "Outstanding Academic Title’ for the year 2012. Since 2013, as Research Fellow with Whale and Dolphin Conservation (WDC) and IUCN SSC/WCPA Marine Mammal Protected Areas Task Force (MMPATF) co-chair with Giuseppe Notarbartolo di Sciara, Hoyt has focussed on the creation and development of the new conservation tool of Important Marine Mammal Areas (IMMAs). In 2016, following a MAVA Foundation pilot project to identify IMMAs in the Mediterranean, the Task Force's GOBI collaboration funded by the German Climate Initiative (IKI) began a six-year project to identify and implement IMMAs across most of the southern hemisphere. The IMMA tool has been received and widely endorsed by the Convention on Migratory Species (CMS), the Convention on Biological Diversity (CBD), various commissions within the International Union for Conservation of Nature (IUCN), the International Whaling Commission, as well as national governments and scientists.

== Writing ==
Hoyt wrote the first book on whale watching, The Whale Watcher’s Handbook (Doubleday, Penguin, 1984), which zoologist—BBC-TV presenter Mark Carwardine named his number one wildlife-book classic. "When Hoyt wrote this book, he was well ahead of his time…few people had grasped the concept of whale-watching as a major, worldwide growth industry…It has been very influential over the years." Hoyt also wrote the resolution that put whale watching on the International Whaling Commission agenda in the 1990s. That book, as well as his first book about his seven summers in the 1970s and 1980s with killer whales, or orcas, are considered classic whale texts. Orca: The Whale Called Killer is still in print after more than 40 years.

Among his other books are five written for children and six academic books. Two popular volumes on social insects, The Earth Dwellers, (Simon & Schuster, 1996) and Insect Lives (Harvard Univ. Press, 2002, with Smithsonian entomologist Ted Schultz) broke new ground. In Hoyt's "delightful…multi-layered" The Earth Dwellers, the "ant’s eye view of life works spectacularly" as Hoyt "fashions the ants into enchanting characters" charting "an insect’s course through sex, aggression and foreign policy". Insect Lives, an American Library Association "Outstanding Book for the College Bound" is a "potpourri of fascinating excerpts written by some of the finest insect biologists and naturalists spanning many centuries." A deep sea book called Creatures of the Deep (Firefly, 2001) won the American Society of Journalists & Authors, Inc. Outstanding Book Award, General Nonfiction. A second deep sea book, Weird Sea Creatures, this time for children, was published in 2013. In 2017 Hoyt published Encyclopedia of Whales, Dolphins and Porpoises which "draws on more than 40 years of scientific interactions with these intelligent and fascinating creatures," according to Library Journal: "Hoyt writes movingly on life cycles, the future for these animals and how readers can get involved in protecting them."

== Research and conservation ==
Hoyt is currently Research Fellow with WDC, Whale and Dolphin Conservation and Director of Marine Mammals for marinebio.org. He also leads WDC's Global Marine Protected Areas Programme launched in 2008 by Team Russia as part of the round-the-world Volvo Ocean Race. He is an appointed member of the IUCN Species Survival Commission's Cetacean Specialist Group (SSC-CSG) and the World Commission on Protected Areas (WCPA). He is a co-founder and serves on the steering and programme committees of the International Committee on Marine Mammal Protected Areas (icmmpa.org).

The research and conservation project Hoyt co-founded and has co-led since 1999, the Far East Russia Orca Project, has pioneered visual and acoustic monitoring, training of Russian students, and whale conservation in the remote, inhospitable Kamchatka seas, and has produced a number of papers on the communication and behavioural ecology of killer whales. This work has led to improved understanding of the animals' acoustic repertoire and complex social structure, which includes matrilineal family clans, pods consisting of several families, and much larger "super-pods". A related project which he co-directs, the Russian Cetacean Habitat Project, aims to study and conserve habitat for humpback, killer, fin, North Pacific right and Baird's beaked whales around the Russian Commander Islands. In 2013, he helped launch and became co-chair of the IUCN SSC/WCPA Marine Mammal Protected Areas Task Force.

Hoyt has been working for whale and dolphin (cetacean) conservation since the early 1970s when his involvement in the first studies of wild killer whales in Canada led to campaigns to create a marine protected area to save their habitat. This, he says, "set him on a path," and "30 years, 14 books and hundreds of articles later, he has come full circle to the question that he addresses so thoroughly in the research for Marine Protected Areas for Whales, Dolphins and Porpoises," published first in 2005, with a completely revised and expanded second edition in 2011: "What does it mean to save the whales if their habitat is left unprotected?" This work, as well as the supporting website (http://www.cetaceanhabitat.org) "details the current state of cetacean conservation globally" identifying and helping to conserve whale, dolphin and other important biologically diverse habitats in marine reserves and protected areas in the national waters of the world and on the high seas (international waters).

Erich Hoyt's work is "very much at the forefront of work on marine protected areas," [driving] the shift from taxon-oriented protectionism (e.g., the Marine Mammal Protection Act) to more ecosystem-oriented approaches to conservation [and] marking...the growing relative importance of marine conservation vs. terrestrial conservation."

At the same time, Hoyt continues to work on a wide variety of other conservation projects such as multi-disciplinary exhibitions and symposia as well as writing and speaking related to Japanese whaling, whale watching and ocean conservation. In 2010 he co-founded the Beautiful Whale Project and helped to organize and introduce a symposium devoted to "New Tales about Whales in Science, Society and Art" at the United Nations University, Tokyo, as well as the "Eye to Eye with the Whale" exhibition of life-size photographs of Bryant Austin at Temporary Contemporary Gallery in Tokyo, both in December 2010.

A Canadian-US dual citizen, he lives in Bridport, England, with his wife and four children.

== Awards ==
In 1985 and 1986, Hoyt was a Vannevar Bush Fellow in the Public Understanding of Science at the Massachusetts Institute of Technology and, in 1992 and 2000, served as James Thurber Writer-in-Residence at the Thurber House in Columbus, Ohio. In 2013, Hoyt won the Mandy McMath Conservation Award at the annual conference of the European Cetacean Society in Portugal for his body of work including books, papers and work on marine conservation.

Hoyt was awarded an OBE in the 2025 New Year Honours for "services to marine conservation".

== Bibliography ==
=== Adult nonfiction ===
- Planktonia, Firefly, Toronto & New York (2022) ISBN 9780228103837 (also published in Japanese)
- Encyclopedia of Whales, Dolphins and Porpoises, Firefly, Toronto & New York (2017, rev.2023) ISBN 1770859411, ISBN 9781770859418, ISBN 9780228104353 (also published in Japanese)
- Creatures of the Deep, Firefly, Toronto & New York (2001, 2002, rev.2014, rev.2021) ISBN 1552093409, ISBN 9781552093405, ISBN 1770852816, ISBN 9781770852815, ISBN 9780228103295 (also published in Chinese)
- The Earth Dwellers, Simon & Schuster, New York; Touchstone, New York; Mainstream, Edinburgh and London (1996, 1997, 1998); ISBN 0684810867, ISBN 9780684830452, ISBN 1840180870, ISBN 1840181737 (also published in Chinese, Hainan Publishing House, ISBN 7544303225 and ISBN 9787544303224; Japanese, Kadokawa Haruki Jimusho, Tokyo, ISBN 4894560402)
- Sharks and Whales, Fog City Press, San Francisco, CA (2002) ISBN 1877019038 (co-editor and co-author with Leighton Taylor and Mark Carwardine)
- Whales, Dolphins and Porpoises, Time-Life/ Discovery Channel, New York; HarperCollins, London; Reader's Digest, Sydney, Australia; Fog City Press, San Francisco (1998-2008) ISBN 078355284X, ISBN 9780002201056, ISBN 9781740896603 (also published in Danish, Gads Forlag, Copenhagen, ISBN 9780002201056; in Italian, Instituto Geografico de Agostini, Novara, ISBN 8841563621; in Spanish, Ediciones Omega SA, Barcelona and Planeta, Buenos Aires, ISBN 8428211639 and ISBN 950490145X; in Germany, Könemann, Cologne, ISBN 3829056656; in Dutch, Könemann, Cologne, ISBN 978-3-8290-6758-4; in French, Könemann, Cologne, ISBN 2743465565 (Co-editor with Mark Carwardine; co-author with Mark Carwardine, E. Fordyce, P. Gill)
- Seasons of the Whale, Nimbus, Halifax; Chelsea Green, Vermont; Mainstream, Edinburgh; WDCS, Bath; Humane Society of the US, Washington, DC (1990, 1993, 1998, 2013) ISBN 093003130X, ISBN 0921054521, ISBN 1851583173, ISBN 1851583254, (also published in French as Les Saisons de la Baleine, ISBN 2890003302)
- Orca: The Whale Called Killer, Dutton, New York; Robert Hale, London; Firefly, Toronto & New York (1981, 1984, 1990, 1998, rev.2019) ISBN 0525229701, ISBN 0920656293, ISBN 0709042310, ISBN 978-0-920656-25-9, ISBN 9780228102298 (also published in Japanese, ISBN 4886223095)
- The Whales of Canada, Firefly, Toronto & New York (1984, 1988, 1990) ISBN 0920656331
- The Whale Watcher’s Handbook, Penguin, Toronto; Doubleday, New York (1984, 1987, 1991); ISBN 0385190360, ISBN 0140070648 (also published in German as Alle Wale der Welt, ISBN 3922965474)

=== Children’s books ===
- Weird Sea Creatures, Firefly, Toronto & New York (2013) ISBN 9781770851917, ISBN 9781770851979
- Whale Rescue, Firefly, Toronto & New York (2005) ISBN 9781552976005, ISBN 1552976017
- Riding with the Dolphins, Firefly, Toronto & New York (1992) ISBN 0921820577, ISBN 0921820550
- Extinction A-Z, Enslow, Hillside, NJ and Aldershot, UK (1991) ISBN 089490325X
- Meeting the Whales, Firefly, Toronto & New York (1991) ISBN 0921820259, ISBN 9780921820239

=== Academic books ===
- Marine Protected Areas for Whales, Dolphins and Porpoises: A World Handbook for Cetacean Habitat Conservation and Planning. Earthscan/Routledge and Taylor & Francis, London and New York (2011) Revised 2nd edition. ISBN 1844070638, ISBN 1844070646
- Marine Protected Areas for Whales, Dolphins and Porpoises: A World Handbook for Cetacean Habitat Conservation. Earthscan, London and Springfield, Virginia, USA (2005) ISBN 1844070638, ISBN 1844070646
- Marine Mammals of Russia. Kirov, Kirov (2009) Морские млекопитающие России. (with A.M. Burdin and O.A. Filatova) ISBN 9785881868505
- The Killer Whales of Eastern Kamchatka, Alaska SeaLife Centre (2006) (with Alexander Burdin, Hal Sato and Olga Filatova) ISBN 0978543629
- Whale Watching 2001: Worldwide Tourism Numbers, Expenditures, and Expanding Socioeconomic Benefits. International Fund for Animal Welfare, Yarmouth Port, MA, USA. ISBN 1901002098 and ISBN 9781901002096
- The Performing Orca—Why the Show Must Stop. An in-depth review of the captive orca industry, WDCS, Bath, UK (1992) ISBN 0951907808
- Conserving the Wild Relatives of Crops, Addison-Wesley Iberoamericana, México; IBPGR-United Nations FAO, Rome; WWF-Int’l and IUCN, Gland, Switzerland (1988, 1992) ISBN 2-88085-072-X (also published in French as La Conservation des Plantes Sauvages Apparentées aux Plantes Cultivées, ISBN 2880850738; in Spanish as Conservando los Parientes Silvestres de las Plantas Cultivadas, ISBN 0201518503; in Portuguese as Conservaçao dos Parentes Silvestres das Plantas Cultivas, ISBN 0201518694; in Chinese, ISBN 7 305 00918 0)

=== Anthologies — fiction and nonfiction (as editor) ===
- Insect Lives. Stories of Mystery & Romance from a Hidden World. Harvard Univ. Press, Cambridge; John Wiley & Sons, New York; Mainstream, London & Edinburgh (1998, 1999, 2000, 2002) (with Ted Schultz) ISBN 9780471282778, ISBN 1840180889, ISBN 9780674009523

=== Contributor (as author of individual chapters) ===
- Whales and Dolphins: Cognition, Culture, Conservation and Human Perceptions, Earthscan/Routledge and Taylor & Francis, London and New York (2011) ISBN 9781849712255
- Encyclopedia of Marine Mammals, 2nd Ed., Academic Press, San Diego, London (2009) ISBN 9780123735539 and Encyclopedia of Marine Mammals, Academic Press, San Diego, London (2002) ISBN 9780125513401
- Ecotourism: Focus on Wildlife and Local Communities, Icfai University Press, Hyderabad, India (2008) ISBN 9788131419373
- Between Species: Celebrating the Dolphin-Human Bond, Sierra Club, San Francisco (2003) ISBN 1578050707
- Encyclopedia of the Biosphere, Gale, Detroit (also in Spanish and Catalan) (2000) ISBN 9780787645069
- Tools of the Writers’ Trade, Harper Collins, New York (1991) ISBN 0060163631
- The Greenpeace Book of Dolphins, Random Century, London; Sterling, London (1990, 1991) ISBN 0712630511, ISBN 0806974842, ISBN 0806974850
- Political Life in Canada, Prentice-Hall, Toronto (1983) ISBN 0136843735
