= Sauce de Portezuelo =

- Resort
- Location in Uruguay
- Coordinates: 34°52′30″S 55°8′25″W
- Country: Uruguay
- Department: Maldonado Department

Population (2011)
  - Total: 128
- Time zone: UTC -3
- Postal code: 20004
- Dial plan: +598 42 (+6 digits)

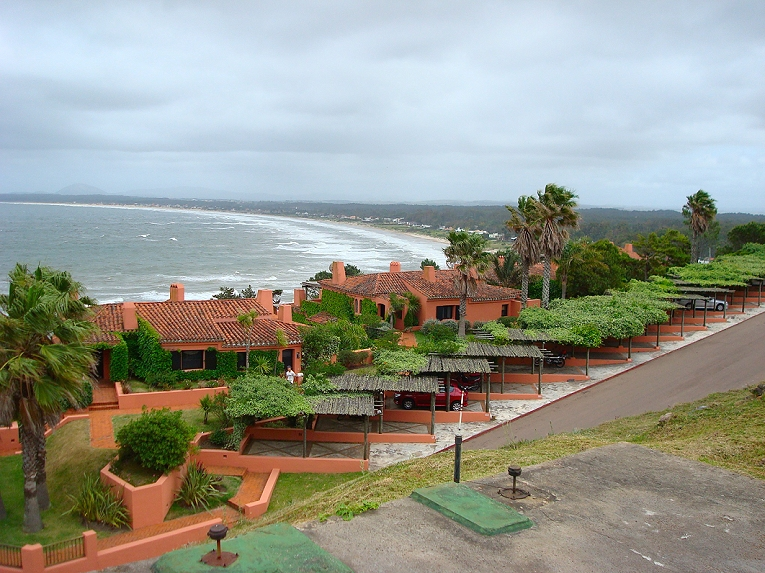
Sauce de Portezuelo, Maldonado Department, Uruguay.

Sauce de Portezuelo is a resort (balneario) in the Maldonado Department of Uruguay.

== Geography ==
The resort is located on the coast of Río de la Plata, about 6 kilometres (3.7 mi) west of Punta Ballena and 7 kilometres (4.3 mi) (by road) east of the resort Punta Negra. To the east it borders the resort Ocean Park and to the north the resort La Capuera, which is on the coast of Laguna del Sauce. Ruta Interbalnearia, also marked as Route 93 for this area, separates it from the later.

== Places of interest ==
Portezuelo was the location chosen by Spanish architect and designer Antoni Bonet i Castellana to build one of his most famous buildings, Solana del Mar. He also planned the layout of the seaside resort.

== Population ==
In 2011 Sauce de Portezuelo had a population of 128 permanent inhabitants and 173 dwellings.

Year	Population	Dwellings
1963	41	21
1975	15	17
1985	19	17
1996	59	27
2004	63	51
2011	128	173

Source: Instituto Nacional de Estadística de Uruguay
