= Punta Colorada =

- Resort
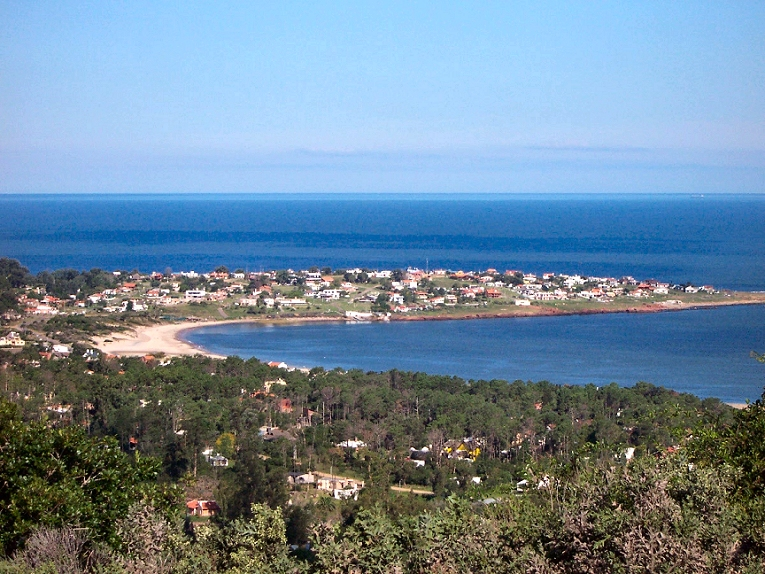

- Location in Uruguay
- Coordinates: 34°54′4″S 55°15′31″W
- Country: Uruguay
- Department: Maldonado Department

Population (2011)
  - Total: 92
- Time zone: UTC -3
- Postal code: 20200
- Dial plan: +598 443 (+5 digits)

Punta Colorada is a small peninsula and a resort in the Maldonado Department of Uruguay.

== Geography ==
The resort is located on the peninsula, 2.5 kilometres (1.6 mi) to the east of Piriápolis, 4 kilometres (2.5 mi) west of the resort Punta Negra and about 24 kilometres (15 mi) to the west of Punta del Este.

== Population ==
In 2011 Punta Colorada had a population of 92 permanent inhabitants and 483 dwellings.

| Year | Population | Dwellings |
|---|---|---|
| 1963 | 56 | 140 |
| 1975 | 75 | 191 |
| 1985 | 38 | 211 |
| 1996 | 63 | 264 |
| 2004 | 62 | 325 |
| 2011 | 92 | 483 |

Source: Instituto Nacional de Estadística de Uruguay

== Beaches of the resort ==
To the west of Punta Colorada is the 2 kilometres (1.2 mi) long beach of Playa San Francisco and to its east the beach Playa Punta Colorada, also known as the west beach of Punta Negra. The local people refer to these beaches as "La Mansa" (which means mild, gentle) and "La Brava" (which for maritime context indicates a very rough sea) respectively, because of the similarities of conditions with Playa Mansa and Playa Brava on either side of Punta del Este.

The "Brava" beach is usually preferred in the morning and at noon in the summer, while in the afternoon the wind usually blows east and swimmers move to the "Mansa" beach and to the rocks around the west side of Punta Colorada, where there are natural sandy pools sheltered from the wind. Brava beach is good for fishing large croaker (February–March), brótolas (August to December), southern kingfish (all year), and mackerel (in winter). Unlike the Playa Brava of Punta del Este, which has dangerous currents, this beach is much safer, although there are days with very big waves that can be dangerous. During the summer high season, there is a lifeguard service and public restrooms. Sand sports (football, volleyball, etc.) are better suited for the "Mansa" beach.

The salinity of the sea varies depending on the predominance of the winds (east and north wings bring saltier water, while west winds bring sweet water) and the volume of rainfall. The warmest waters correspond to the period February to April, while the coldest from June to December. During January comes the warm current from Brazil and pushes away the cold Malvinas current, so it is a transition month. Usually starting in July, but mostly between August and October, there can be seen whales very close to the southern coast.

== See also ==
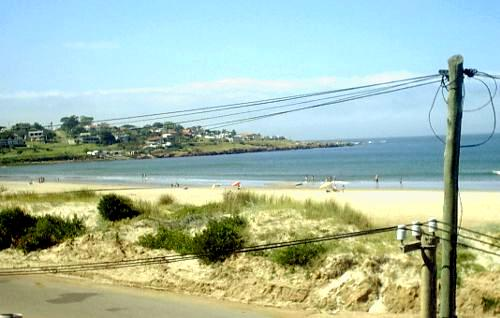
Playa Punta Colorada

- Piriapolis
- Punta del Este
