= Important marine mammal area =

Ecological area

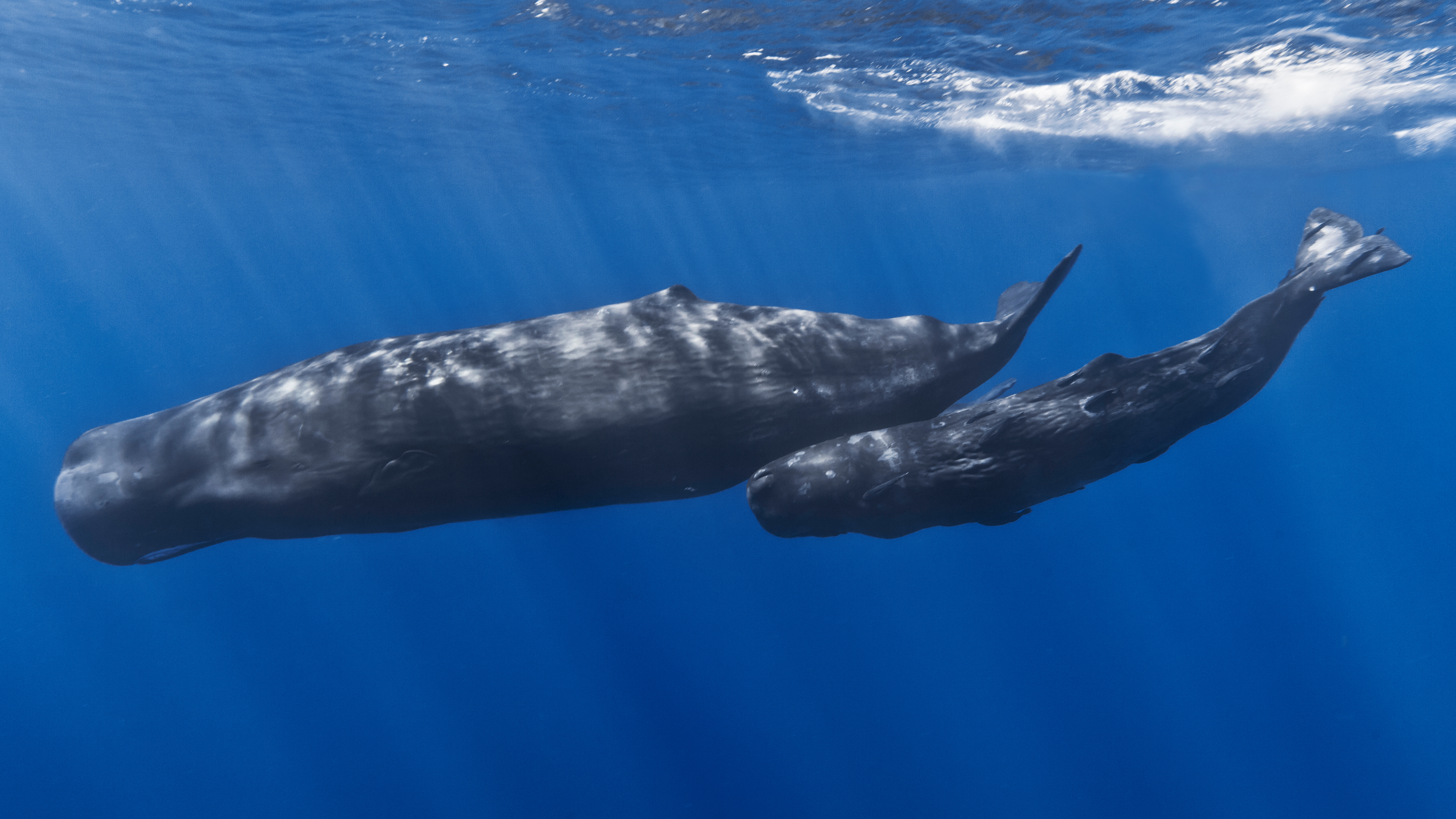
A sperm whale, one of the largest marine mammals

Important Marine Mammal Areas (IMMAs) were formulated by the Marine Mammal Protected Areas Task Force (MMPATF), a joint initiative created in 2013 by the International Committee on Marine Mammal Protected Areas (ICMMPA), the International Union for Conservation of Nature’s (IUCN) World Commission on Protected Areas (WCPA) Marine Vice Chair, and members of the IUCN Species Survival Commission (SSC). The IMMAs are defined as "discrete portions of habitat, important to marine mammal species, that have the potential to be delineated and managed for conservation".

== Global conservation context ==
=== Marine conservation, MPAs and IMMAs ===
Marine conservation is the overarching term that refers to the protection of threatened oceanic species, and usually involves the establishment of marine reserves. Marine conservation is increasingly beginning to make use of protected area models that are based on principles of landscape ecology and ecosystem management.

The most widely used protected area model is Marine protected areas (MPAs), whose purpose is to conserve biodiversity, protect vulnerable ecosystems and enhance marine invertebrate and fish productivity. MPAs however, have failed to properly account for marine mammals, who have been overlooked in many marine conservation efforts. As a result of this noted shortcoming in the previously existing conservation frameworks, IMMAs were introduced as a separate conservation measure to help rectify this issue.

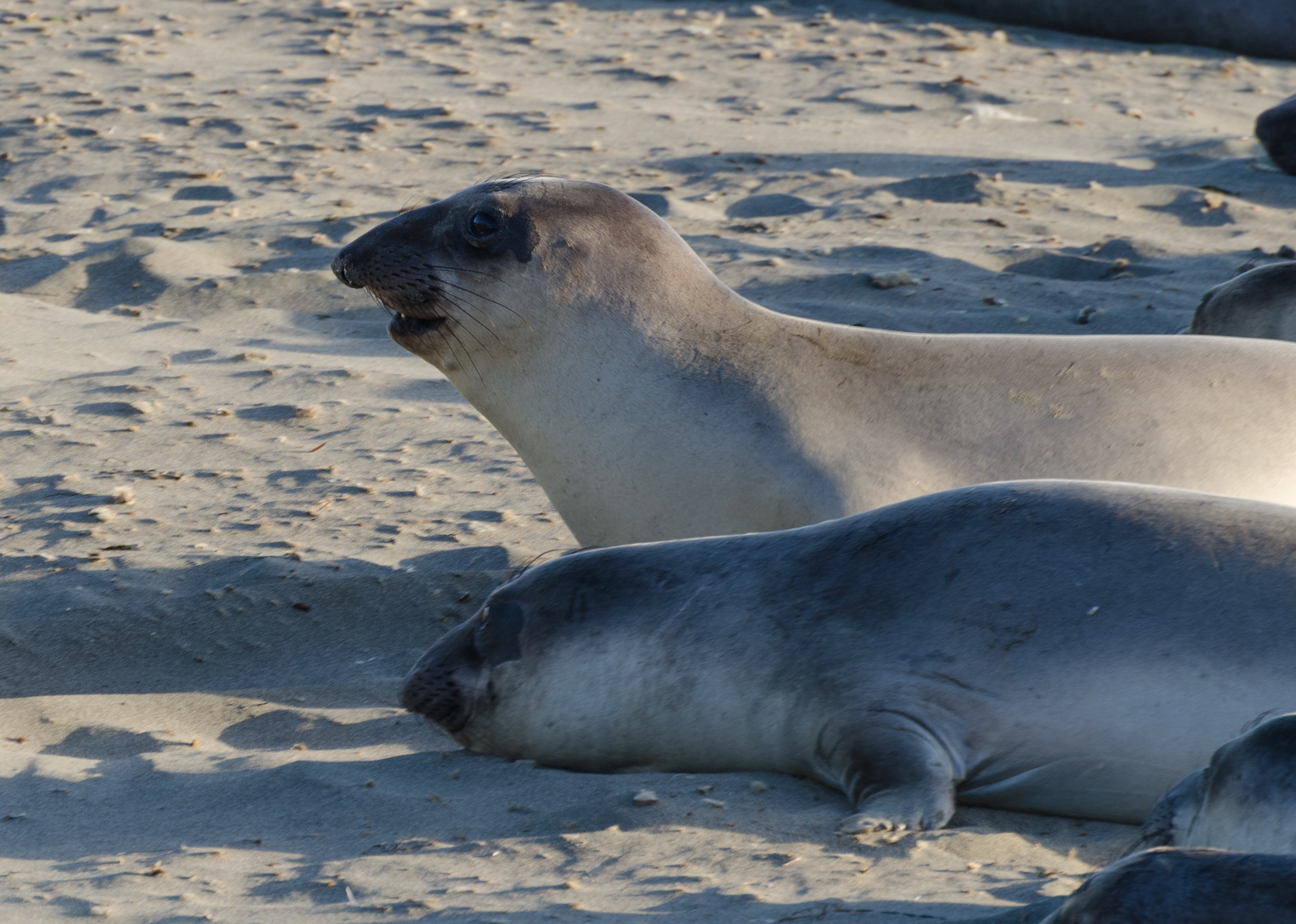
Northern elephant seals

== Criteria for the selection of IMMAs ==
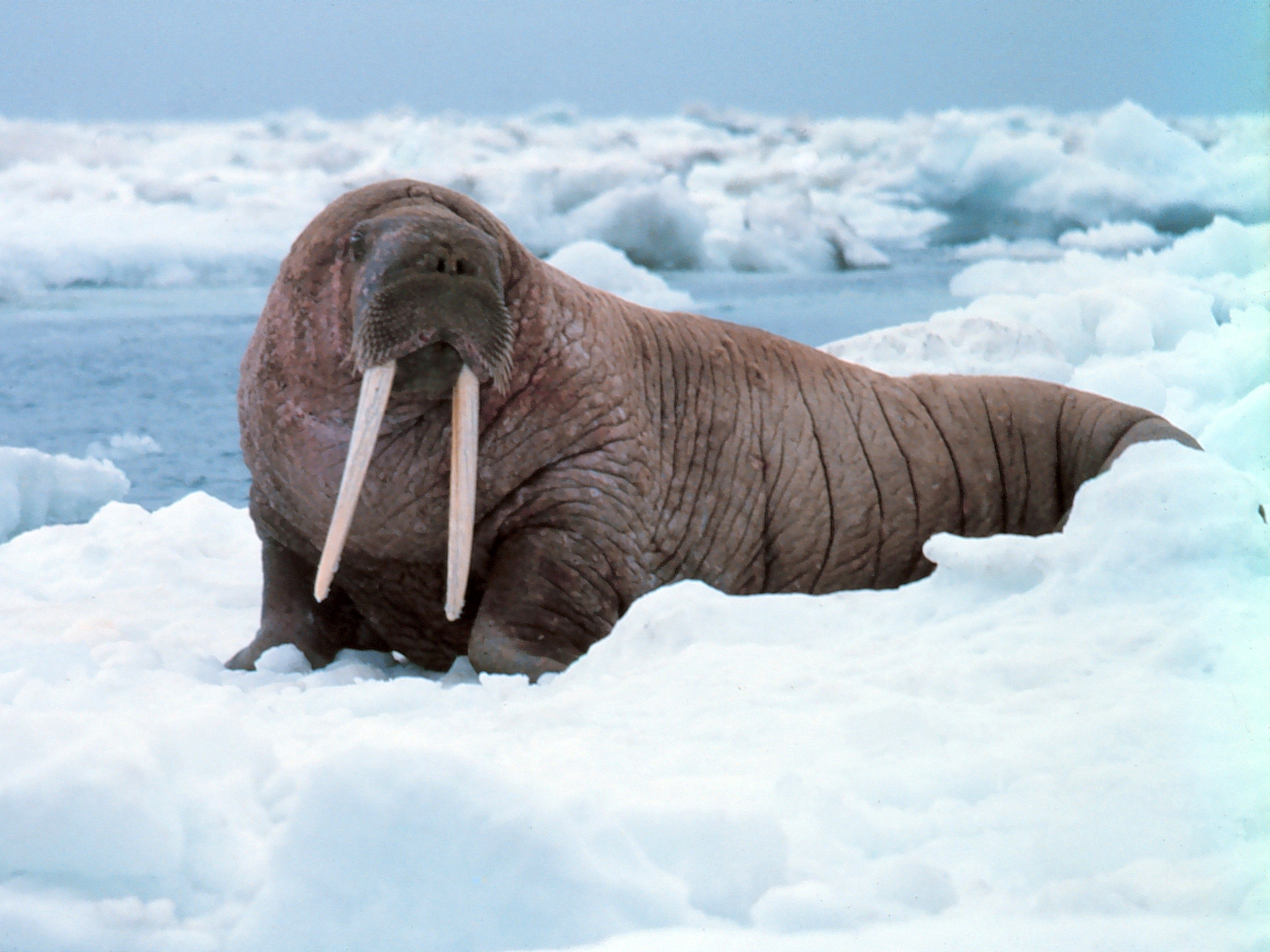
A walrus

The initial criteria for identifying IMMAs were developed at the Workshop for the Development of Important Marine Mammal Area Criteria in Marseille, France, in October 2013. They were further refined in advance of the 3rd International Conference on Marine Mammal Protected Areas in Adelaide, Australia, in November 2014, and through the consultations of a working group following that conference. Finally, a public consultation was held online throughout September–October 2015 on the draft criteria, with the results of the consultation being presented at the Society for Marine Mammalogy Biennial Conference in San Francisco, United States, in December 2015. Consideration in the selection of IMMA criteria was given to the need of IMMAs to be used for the successive identification of Ecologically or Biologically Significant Areas (EBSAs) and Key Biodiversity Areas (KBAs). The criteria for inclusion cover sites that host vulnerable species or a significant percentage of the members of a species, sites that are important for reproduction or feeding, and sites that are home to a wide variety of species.

== IMMA Workshops ==
From 2016 onwards the major activity of the MMPATF has been to organise a series of regional expert workshops tasked with identifying IMMAs in several of the world's marine macroregions. The following seven IMMA workshops have been held to date:

- 2016 – Mediterranean region
- 2017 – Pacific Islands region
- 2018 – Extended Southern Ocean region
- 2018 – North East Indian Ocean and Southeast Asian Seas region
- 2019 – Western Indian Ocean and Arabian Seas region
- 2020 – Australia-New Zealand and South East Indian Ocean region
- 2021 – Black Sea, Turkish Straits System and Caspian Sea region

== Current IMMAs ==
As of October 2021, 173 IMMAs have been identified following the hosting of seven expert workshops in the regions represented above. There are an additional 23 "candidate IMMAs" (cIMMAs) and 140 "Areas of Interest" (AoI). Details of all these are in the online IMMA searchable database, and displayed on the online e-Atlas.
