= Punta Negra, Uruguay =

Punta Negra
- Resort
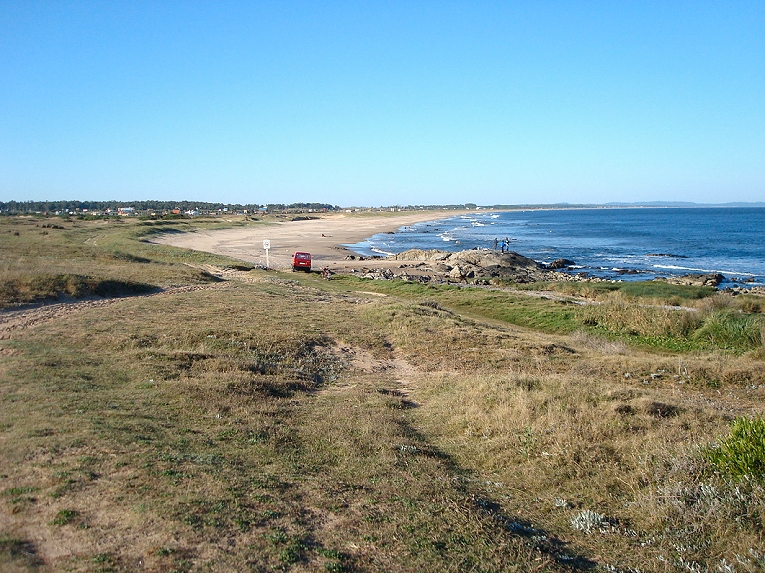
- The resort and the beach of Punta Negra seen from the homonymous peninsula.

- Location in Uruguay
- Coordinates: 34°53′25″S 55°13′15″W
- Country: Uruguay
- Department: Maldonado Department

Population (2011)
  - Total: 178
- Time zone: UTC-03:00
- Postal code: 20200
- Dial plan: +598 443 (+5 digits)

Punta Negra is a small peninsula (punta) and a resort (balneario) in the Maldonado Department of Uruguay.

== Location ==
The resort is located just east of the peninsula, about 10 kilometres (6.2 mi) east of Piriápolis, 4 kilometres (2.5 mi) east of the resort Punta Colorada and 7 kilometres (4.3 mi) west of the resort Sauce de Portezuelo. The beach on its coast is called Playa Punta Negra.

== Population ==
In 2011 Punta Negra had a population of 178 permanent inhabitants and 505 dwellings.

| Year | Population | Dwellings |
|---|---|---|
| 1963 | 69 | 18 |
| 1975 | 29 | 25 |
| 1985 | 11 | 18 |
| 1996 | 42 | 72 |
| 2004 | 50 | 175 |
| 2011 | 178 | 505 |

Source: Instituto Nacional de Estadística de Uruguay
