= La Capuera =

- Town
- Location within Uruguay
- Coordinates: 34°51′20″S 55°07′43″W
- Country: Uruguay
- Department: Maldonado Department
- Elevation: 29 m (95 ft)

Population (2011)
  - Total: 2,838
- Time zone: UTC -3
- Postal code: 20004
- Dial plan: +598 42 (+6 digits)
- Climate: Cfa

La Capuera is a town of the Maldonado Department in Uruguay.

== Geography ==
The town is located on the coast of the lake Laguna del Sauce, near kilometre 120 of Route 93, about 18 kilometres west of the capital city, Maldonado and just west of the Laguna del Sauce International Airport.

== Population ==
In 2011, La Capuera had a population of 2,838.

Year	Population
1963	10
1975	25
1985	25
1996	239
2004	494
2011	2,838

Source: Instituto Nacional de Estadística de Uruguay

== See also ==
- Maldonado Department
