= Chiloé National Park =

National park in Chiloé Island, Los Lagos Region, Chile

- IUCN category II (national park)
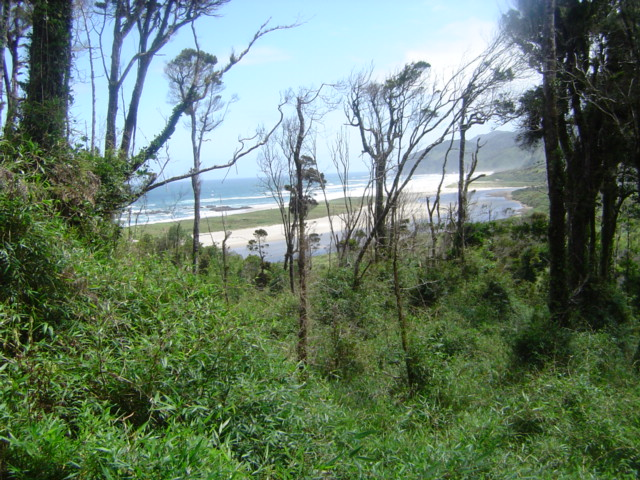
- Abtao, Chiloé National Park
- Location: Los Lagos Region, Chile
- Nearest city: Chonchi
- Area: 431 km^{2} (166 sq mi)
- Established: 1983
- Governing body: Corporación Nacional Forestal

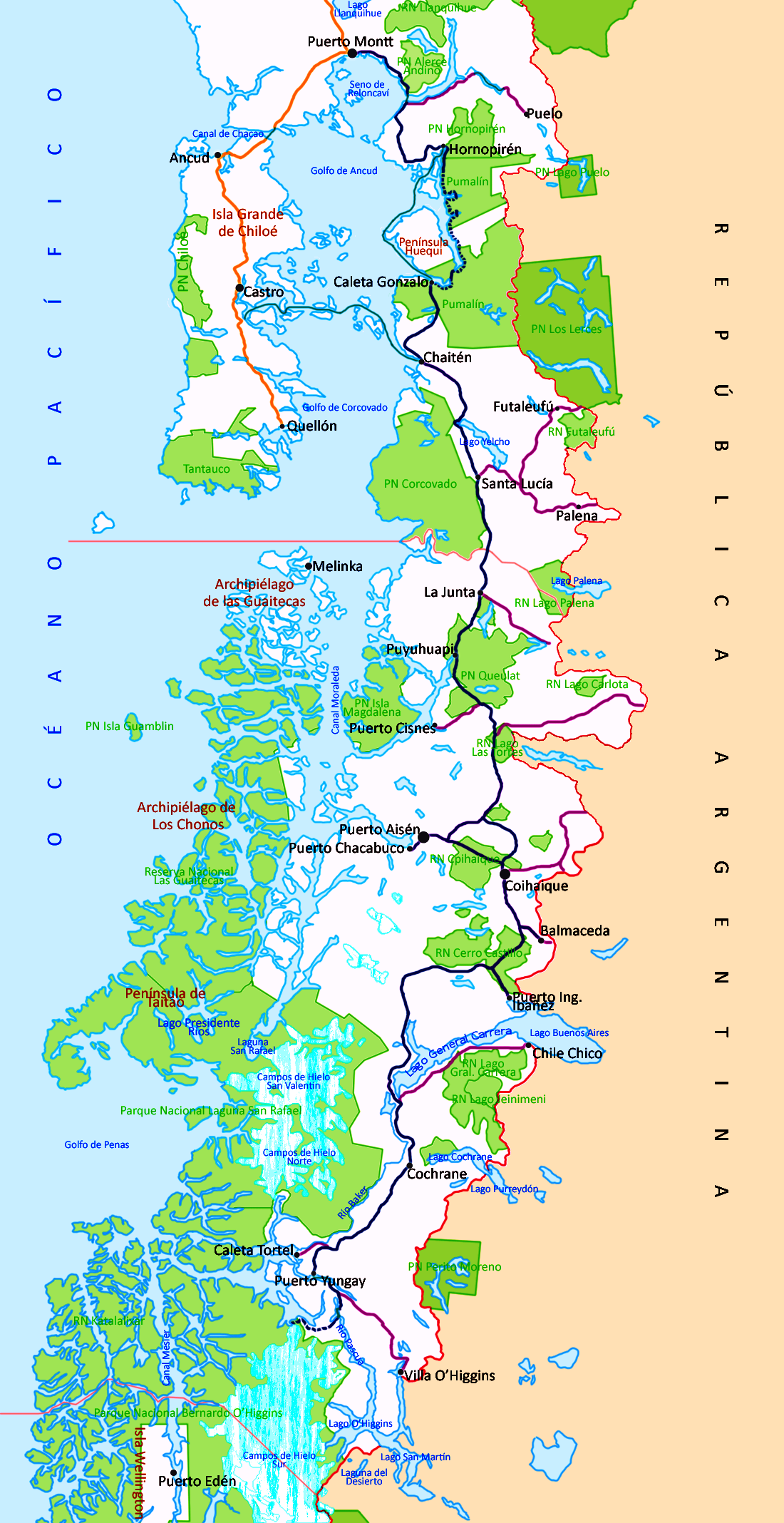
Chiloé Park is situated in western Chiloé Island on the upper left corner of the map

Chiloé National Park is a national park of Chile, located in the western coast of Chiloé Island, in Los Lagos Region (region of the lakes). It encompasses an area of 430.57 km^{2} (166 sq mi) divided into two main sectors: the smallest, called Chepu, is in the commune of Ancud, whereas the rest, called Anay, is in the communes of Dalcahue, Castro and Chonchi. The greater portion of the Park is in the foothills of Chilean Coastal Range, known as the Cordillera del Piuchén. It includes zones of dunes, Valdivian temperate rain forests, swamps, and peat bogs. A small portion, Metalqui, is an islet with an area of 0.5 km^{2} (0.19 sq mi). It is located between 42° 07' and 42° 13' south latitude and between 73° 55' and 74° 09' west longitude (see 42.10°S 74.02°W).

== History ==
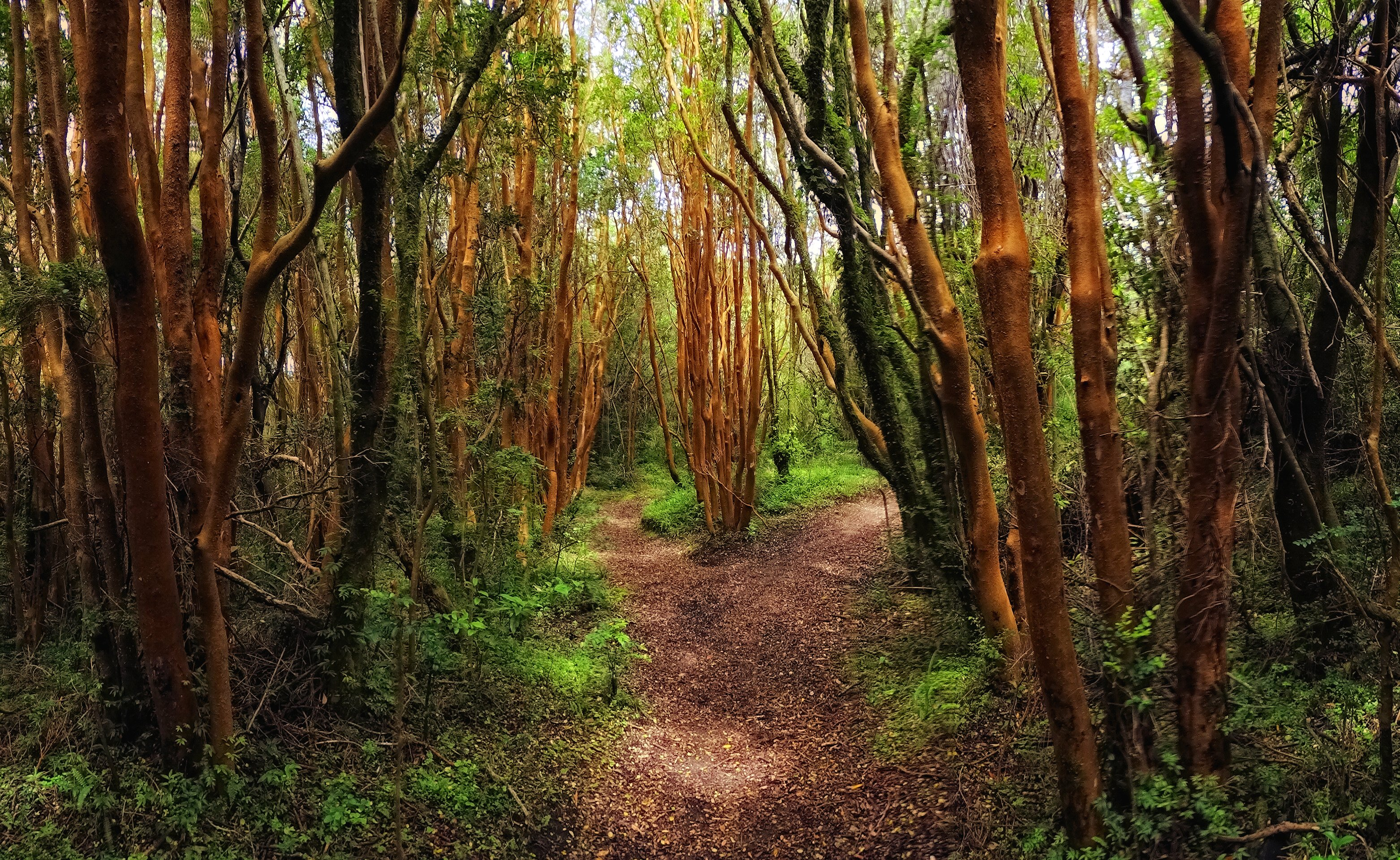
Valdivian temperate rain forest in the park

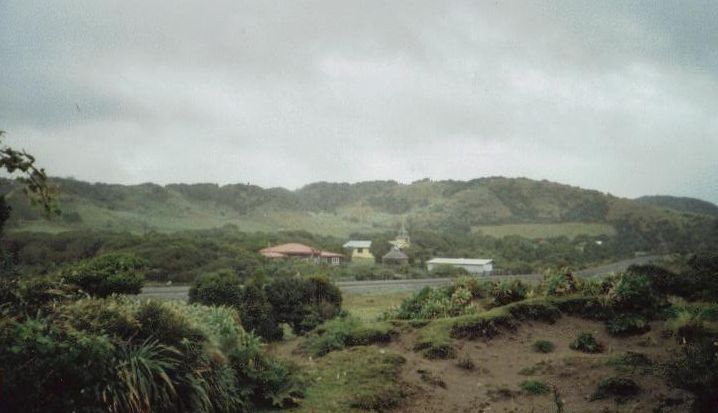
Village Chanquín formerly in the park

The park was created by Supreme Chilean Decree N° 734, in 1982. Its surface area has been reduced by more than 45 km^{2} (17 sq mi) by populated land that was initially in the protected area.

== Climate ==
The climate is wet and temperate, with average annual temperatures of 11 °C (52 °F) and abundant precipitation distributed uniformly throughout the year, varying according to the altitude. On the Pacific coast over 3,000 mm (120 in) fall annually, while in the higher elevations of the Piuchén, nearly 5,000 mm (200 in) fall, and on the rain-shadowed eastern slopes, as little as 2,500 mm (98 in) in annual precipitation is measured.

== Flora ==
The predominant vegetation is that of the Valdivian forest, a dense forest formed by perennial trees, shrubs and climbing plants. The rainforests are made up of evergreen southern beech (Nothofagus), and some native conifers, including the magnificent alerce (Fitzroya cupressoides). Extensive bogs and swamps are found in the hills. The Chilean rhubarb is also very common.

== Fauna ==
The feature that made the island of Chiloe and the Gulf of Corcovado world-famous is the presence of local population of pygmy blue whales (The Cetacean Conservation Center carries out the Blue Whale Project). There are only 4 or more known forging grounds of them and blue whales in Southern Hemisphere including Chiloe region. In this area, it is notable that whales often enter into narrow fiords either to feed or rest. This area is also an important habitats for other whale species such as humpbacks, finbacks, seis, and possibly for critically endangered, only around 30 animals-remaining Peru/Chilean stock of southern right whales as well. Whales can also be observed close to shore in southern side of the island, such as near Caleta Zorra.

=== Important Bird Area ===
The park has been designated an Important Bird Area (IBA) by BirdLife International because it supports significant populations of Chilean pigeons, slender-billed parakeets, black-throated huet-huets and chucao tapaculos.
