= Puñihuil =

- Location within Chile
- Coordinates: 41.928841°S 74.037812°W
- Country: Chile
- Region: Los Lagos Region

Puñihuil is a cove with a small community on the northwestern coast of the Isla Grande de Chiloe, which lies near the coast of Northern Patagonia in Chile.

The Islotes de Puñihuil Natural Monument, three small islands, lie to the west and north of the cove. The monument is the only known shared breeding site for Humboldt and Magellanic penguins. It is also a breeding area for other species including the red-legged cormorant and kelp gull.

The Alfaguara project, a marine life conservation project operates from Puñihuil. The focus of the project is on preservation of endangered blue whales, for which the waters to the northwest are an important feeding area.

== Gallery ==
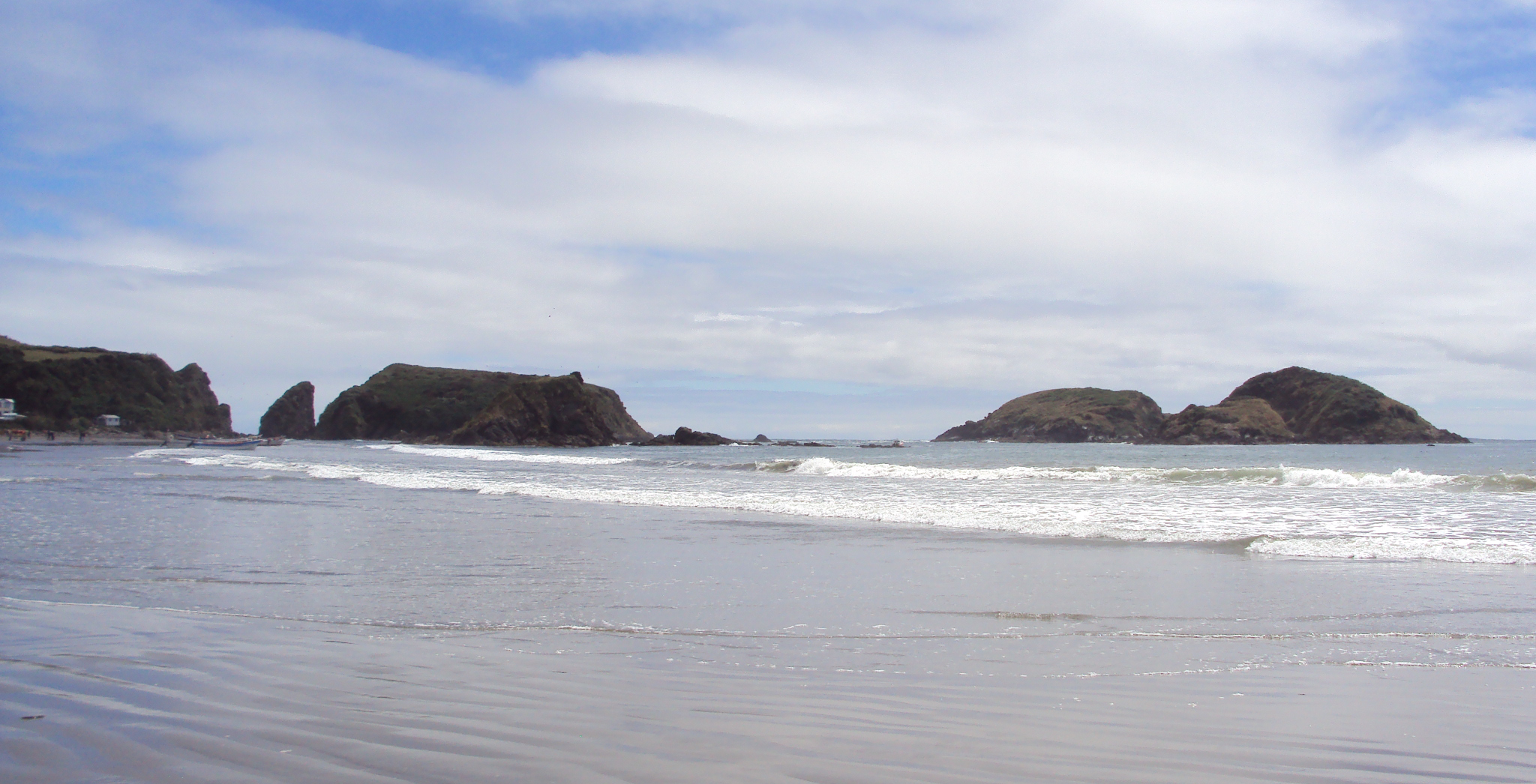
Beach of Puñihuil, islands in the background

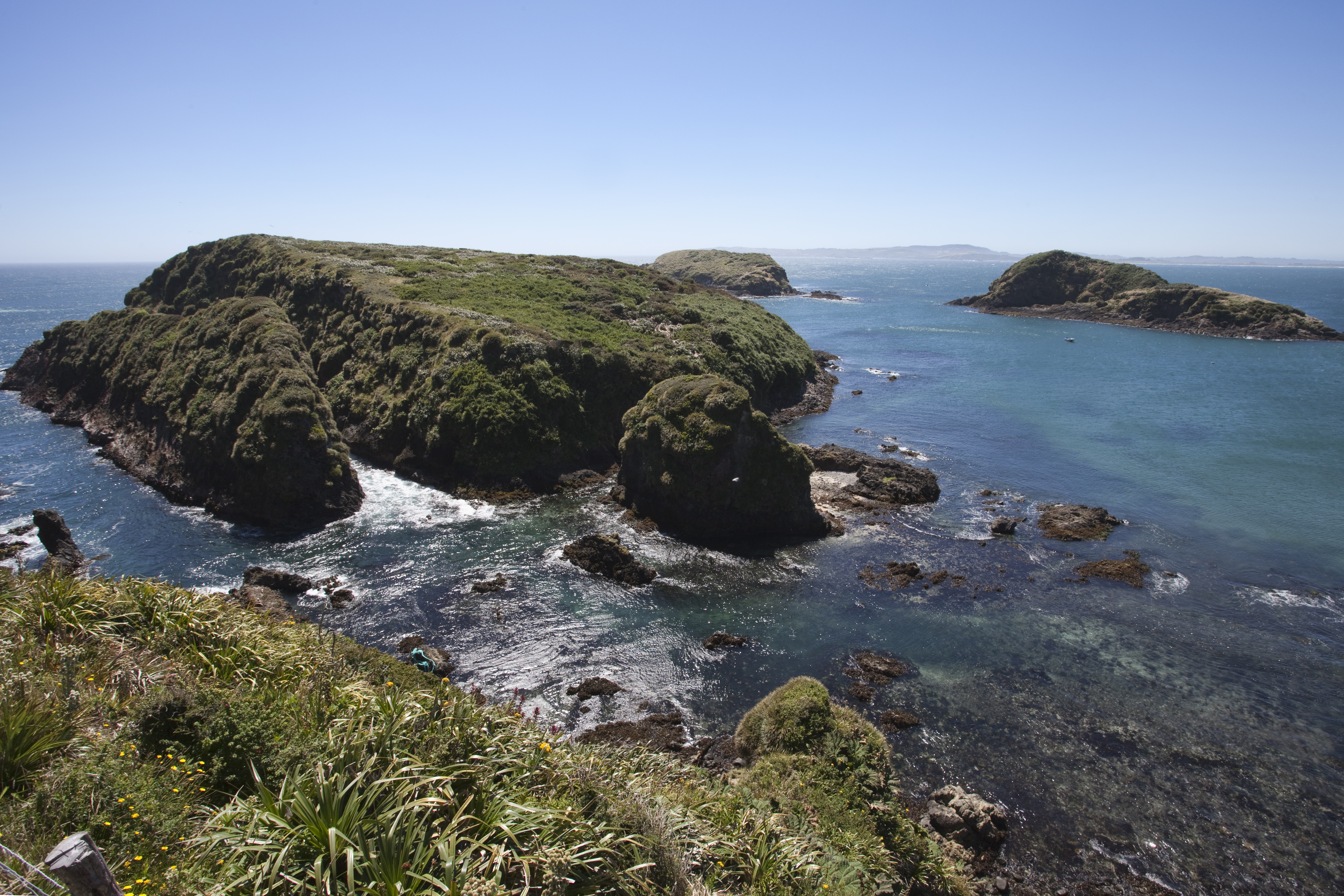
Islotes de Puñihuil

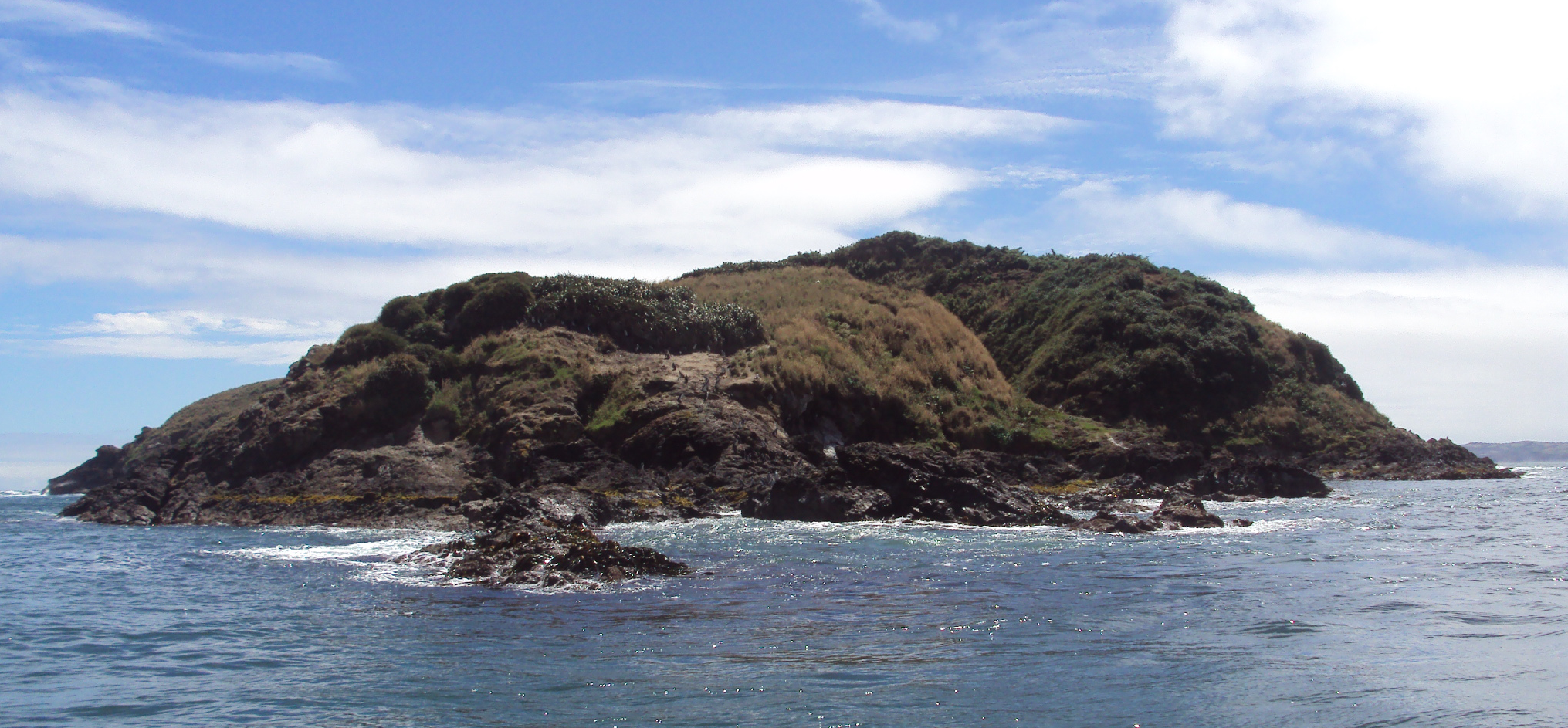
Islotes de Puñihuil III

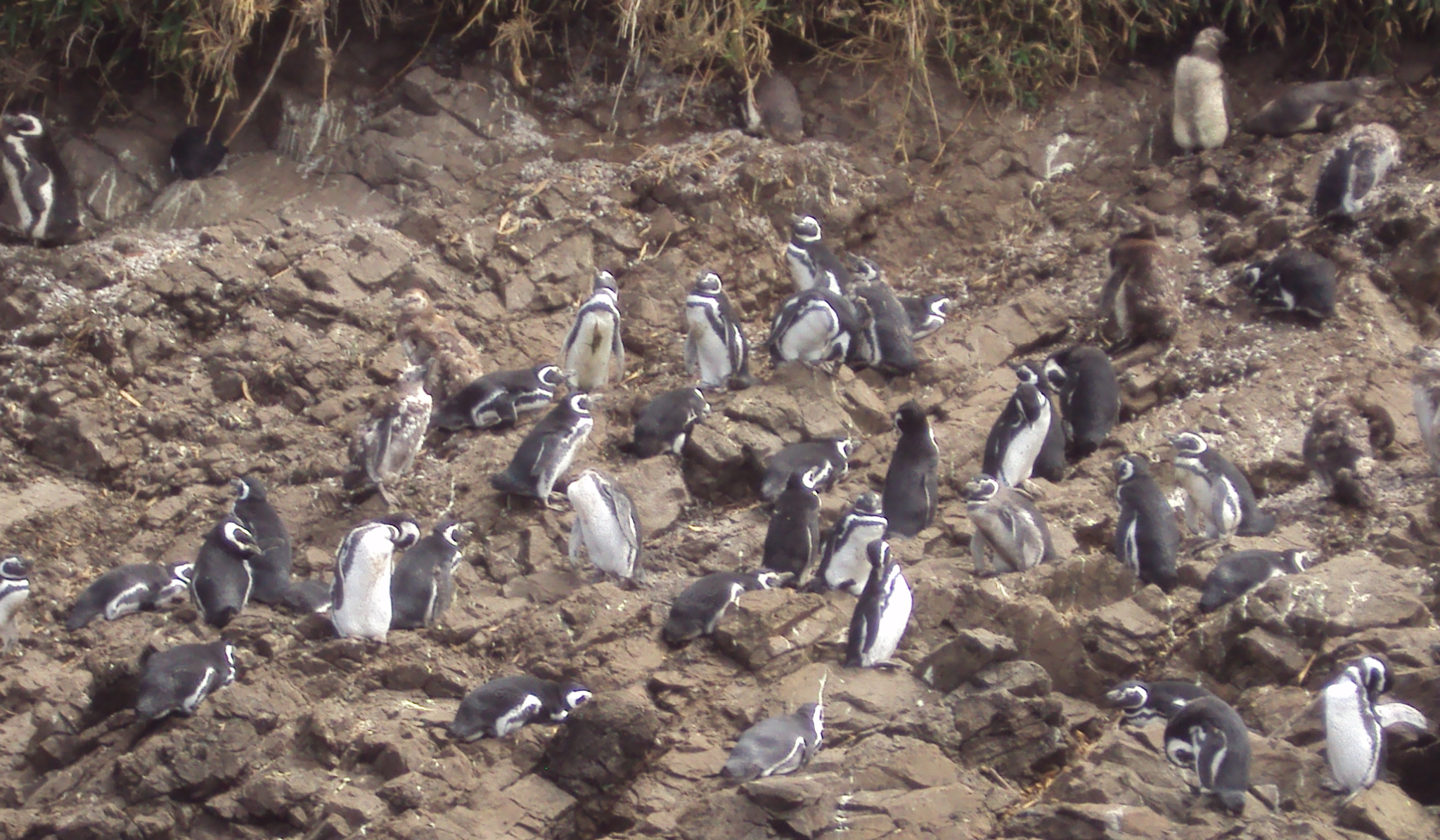
Penguins on the Islotes de Puñihuil

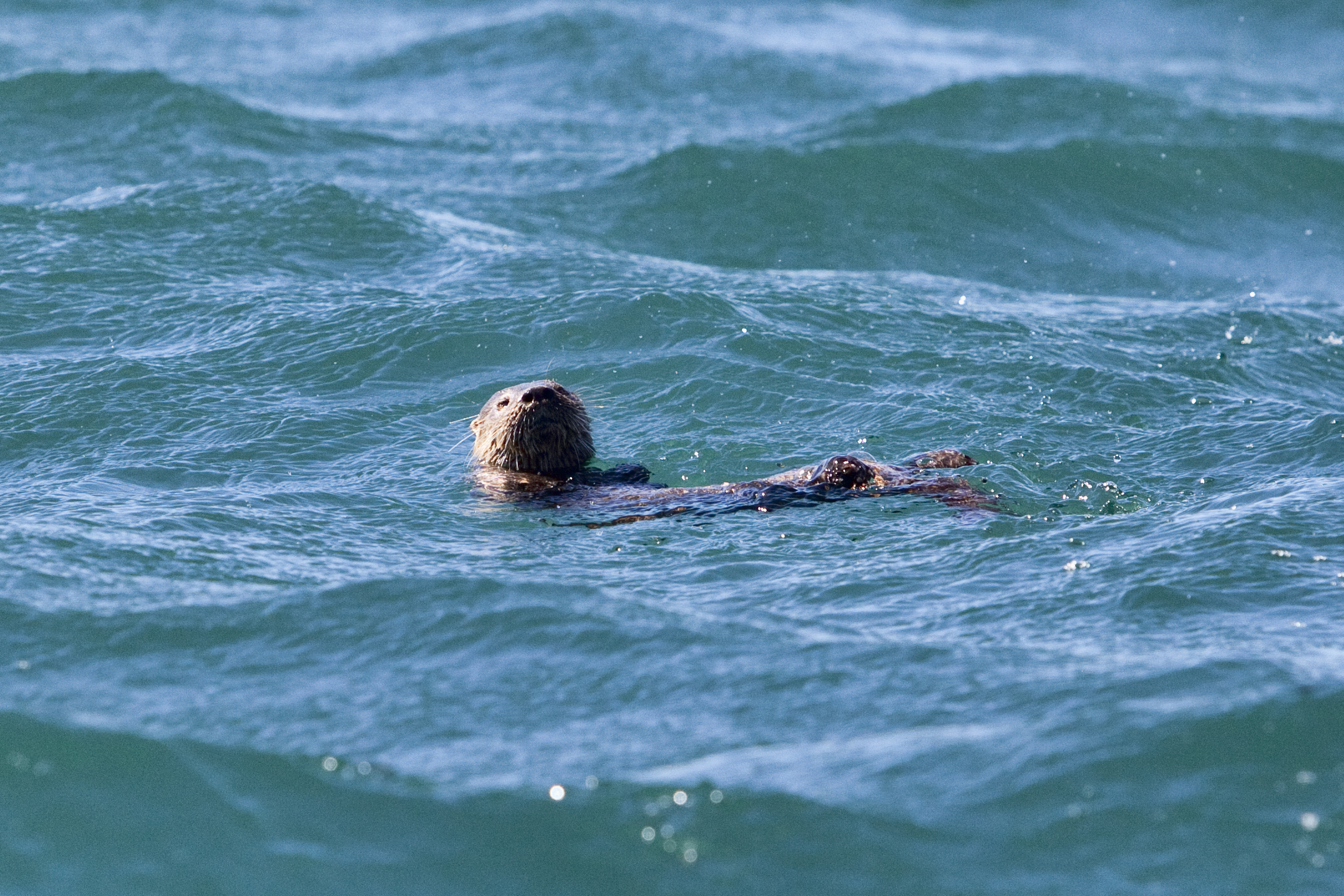
Marine otter near Puñihuil

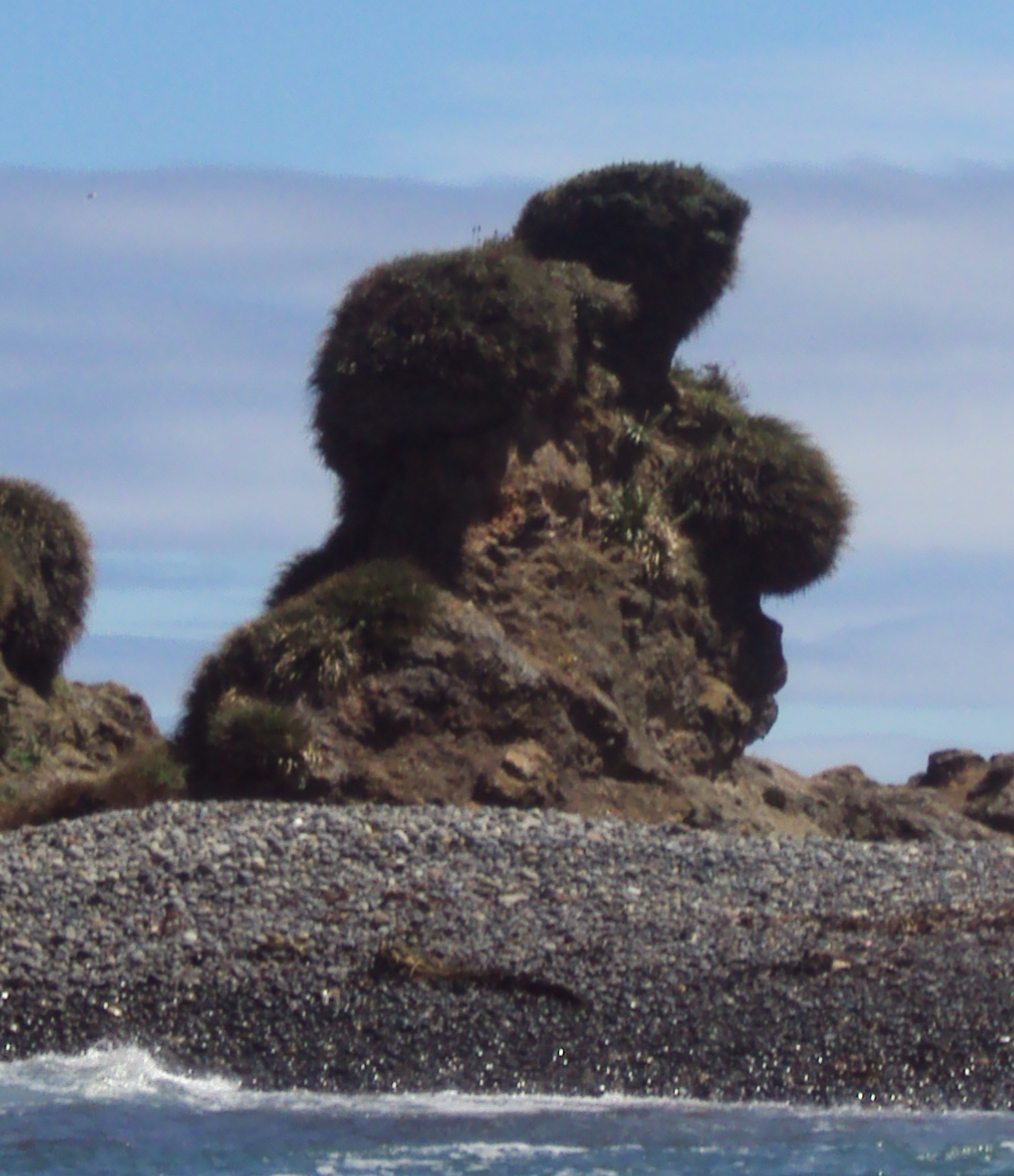
"The Bear´s Rock", a natural rock formation
