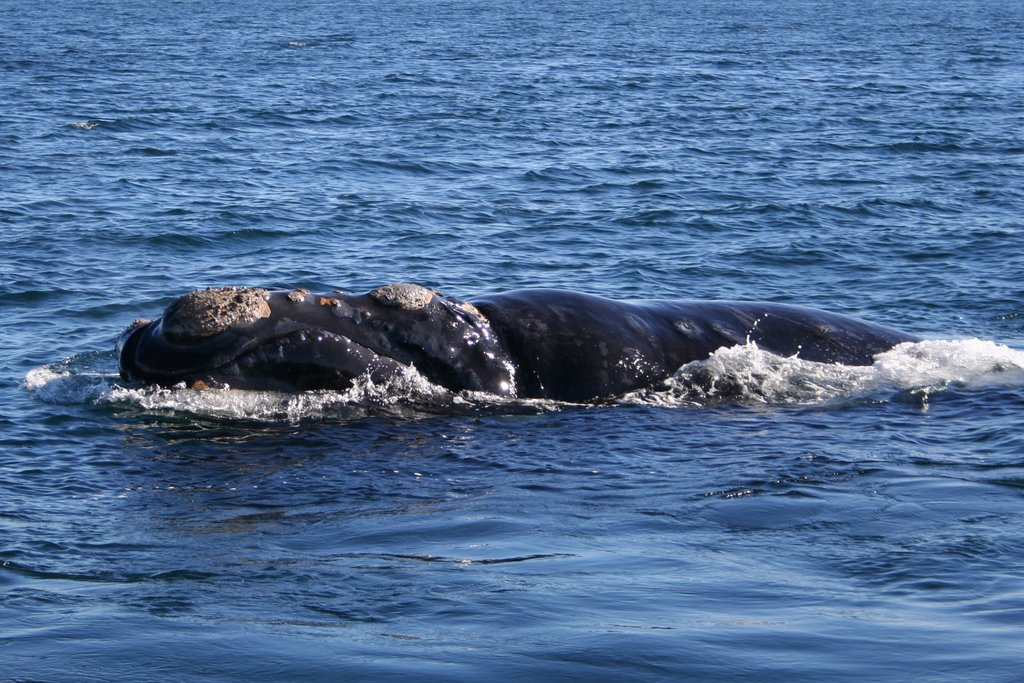

Conservation status
- Least Concern (IUCN 3.1)
- CITES Appendix I

Scientific classification
- Kingdom: Animalia
- Phylum: Chordata
- Class: Mammalia
- Order: Artiodactyla
- Infraorder: Cetacea
- Family: Balaenidae
- Genus: Eubalaena
- Species: E. australis

Binomial name
- Eubalaena australis (Desmoulins, 1822)
- Range

Synonyms
- List: Balaena glacialis (Mueller, 1776); Balaena antarctica (Lesson, 1828); Balaena antipodarum (Gray, 1843); Hunterus temminckii (Gray, 1864); Macleayius australiensis (Gray, 1865); Eubalaena capensis (Gray, 1866); Halibalaena britannica (Gray, 1873); Eubalaena glacialis australis (Tomilin, 1962); Balaena glacialis australis (Scheffer & Rice, 1963)

= Southern right whale =

Species of whale

The southern right whale (Eubalaena australis) is a large baleen whale and one of three species of right whale belonging to the genus Eubalaena. Found throughout the Southern Hemisphere, it inhabits oceans between the latitudes of 20° and 60° south. Like its northern relatives, the southern right whale is noted by its broad back without a dorsal fin, a long, arching mouth, and white growths on its head known as callosities. Previously hunted for hundreds of years, almost to extinction, the species is now protected and its global population was estimated to be around 13,600 (2009).

Each year, the southern right whale migrates. During the summer months, it feeds on zooplankton and krill in the cold waters of the Southern Ocean, often near Antarctica. In the winter, it travels northward to the warmer coastal waters off Argentina, Australia, Brazil, South Africa, and New Zealand to breed and calve. The whales are known for their active behavior at the surface, which includes breaching and a unique practice called "tail sailing," where they use their flukes to catch the wind.

Historically, southern right whales were the primary target for whalers (thus the "right" whale to hunt), who killed tens of thousands from the 18th to the 20th century, decimating the population. International protection was established in 1937, though illegal whaling by the Soviet Union continued into the 1970s. Since cessation of industrialized whale slaughtering, the population has seen a steady increase, growing an estimated 7% per year. Today, the species is a focus for whale watching, though it continues to face threats from ship strikes, entanglement in fishing gear, and pollution.

== Taxonomy ==
Right whales were first classified in the genus Balaena in 1758 by Carl Linnaeus, who at the time considered all right whales (including the bowhead) to be a single species. In the 19th and 20th centuries the family Balaenidae was the subject of great taxonometric debate. Authorities have repeatedly recategorised the three populations of right whale plus the bowhead whale, as one, two, three or four species, either in a single genus or in two separate genera. In the early whaling days, they were all thought to be a single species, Balaena mysticetus.

The southern right whale was initially described as Balaena australis by Desmoulins in 1822. Eventually, it was recognised that bowheads and right whales were different, and John Edward Gray proposed the genus Eubalaena for the right whale in 1864. Later, morphological factors such as differences in the skull shape of northern and southern right whales indicated at least two species of right whale—one in the Northern Hemisphere, the other in the Southern Ocean. As recently as 1998, Rice, in his comprehensive and otherwise authoritative classification, Marine mammals of the world: systematics and distribution, listed just two species: Balaena glacialis (all of the right whales) and Balaena mysticetus (the bowheads).

In 2000, Rosenbaum et al. disagreed, based on data from their genetic study of DNA samples from each of the whale populations. Genetic evidence now shows that the northern and southern populations of right whale have not interbred for between 3 million and 12 million years, confirming the southern right whale as a distinct species. The northern Pacific and Atlantic populations are also distinct, with the North Pacific right whale being more closely related to the southern right whale than to the North Atlantic right whale. Genetic differences between E. japonica (North Pacific) and E. australis (South Pacific) are much smaller than other baleen whales represent among different ocean basins.

It is believed that the right whale populations first split because of the joining of North and South America when the Panama isthmus formed. The rising temperatures at the equator then created a second split, into the northern and southern groups, preventing them from interbreeding.

In 2002, the Scientific Committee of the International Whaling Commission (IWC) accepted Rosenbaum's findings, and recommended that the Eubalaena nomenclature be retained for this genus.

The cladogram is a tool for visualising and comparing the evolutionary relationships between taxa. The point where a node branches off is analogous to an evolutionary branching – the diagram can be read left-to-right, much like a timeline. The following cladogram of the family Balaenidae serves to illustrate the current scientific consensus as to the relationships between the southern right whale and the other members of its family.

Family Balaenidae

- Family Balaenidae
  - Eubalaena (right whales)
    - E. glacialis North Atlantic right whale
    - - E. japonica North Pacific right whale
      - E. australis southern right whale
  - Balaena (bowhead whales)
    B. mysticetus bowhead whale

The right whale family, Balaenidae

Other junior synonyms for E. australis have included B. antarctica (Lesson, 1828), B. antipodarum (Gray, 1843), Hunterus temminckii (Gray, 1864), and E. glacialis australis (Tomilin, 1962) (see side panel for more synonyms).

== Description ==
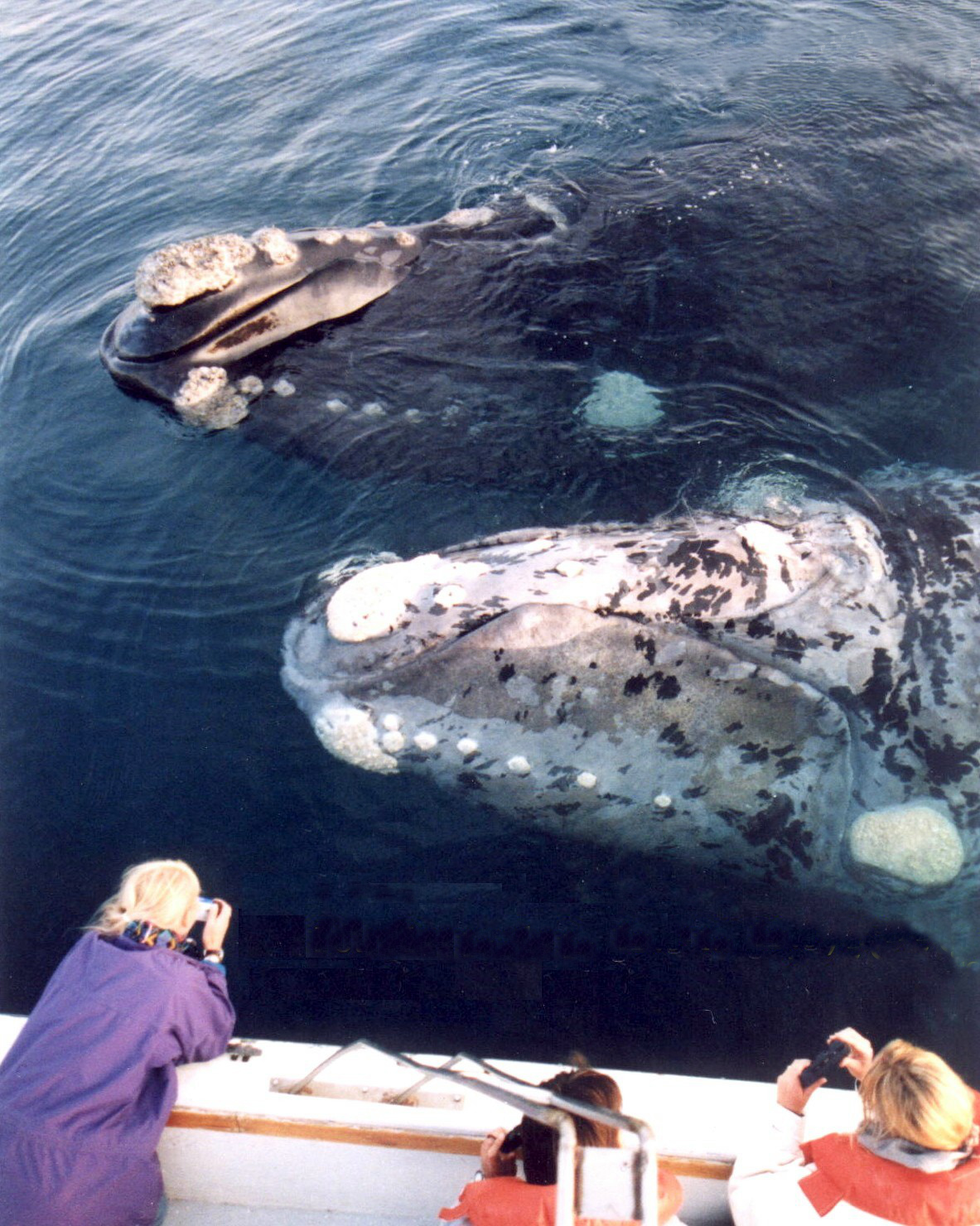
Two distinctive colouration patterns

Like other right whales, the southern right whale is readily distinguished from others by the callosities on its head, a broad back without a dorsal fin, and a long arching mouth that begins above the eye. Its skin is very dark grey or black, occasionally with some white patches on the belly. The right whale's callosities appear white due to large colonies of cyamids (whale lice). It is almost indistinguishable from the closely related North Atlantic and the North Pacific right whales, displaying only minor skull differences. It may have fewer callosities on its head than North Atlantic and more on its lower lips than the two northern species. The biological functions of callosities are unclear, with proposed purposes including protection, identification, and use in mating.

An adult female is 15 m (49 ft) and can weigh up to 47 tonnes (46 long tons; 52 short tons), with the larger records of 17–18 m (56–59 ft) in length and up to 80 tonnes (79 long tons; 88 short tons) in weight, making them slightly smaller than other right whales in the Northern Hemisphere. On each side of the upper jaw are 200–270 baleen plates. These are narrow and approximately 3 m (9.8 ft) long, and are covered in very thin hairs. The pectoral fin is 1.7 m (5.6 ft) long. The testicles of right whales are likely to be the largest of any animal, each weighing around 500 kg (1,100 lb). This suggests that sperm competition is important in the mating process. The penis can reach 2 m (6.6 ft) in length.

The proportion and numbers of molten-coloured individuals are notable in this species compared with the other species in the Northern Hemisphere. Some whales remain white even after growing up.

The oldest living southern right whale was 70 years old. However, a 2024 study found that the median lifespan is around 73, with some individuals surviving to over 130.

== Behaviour ==
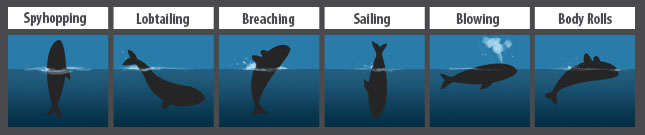
Surfacing behaviour

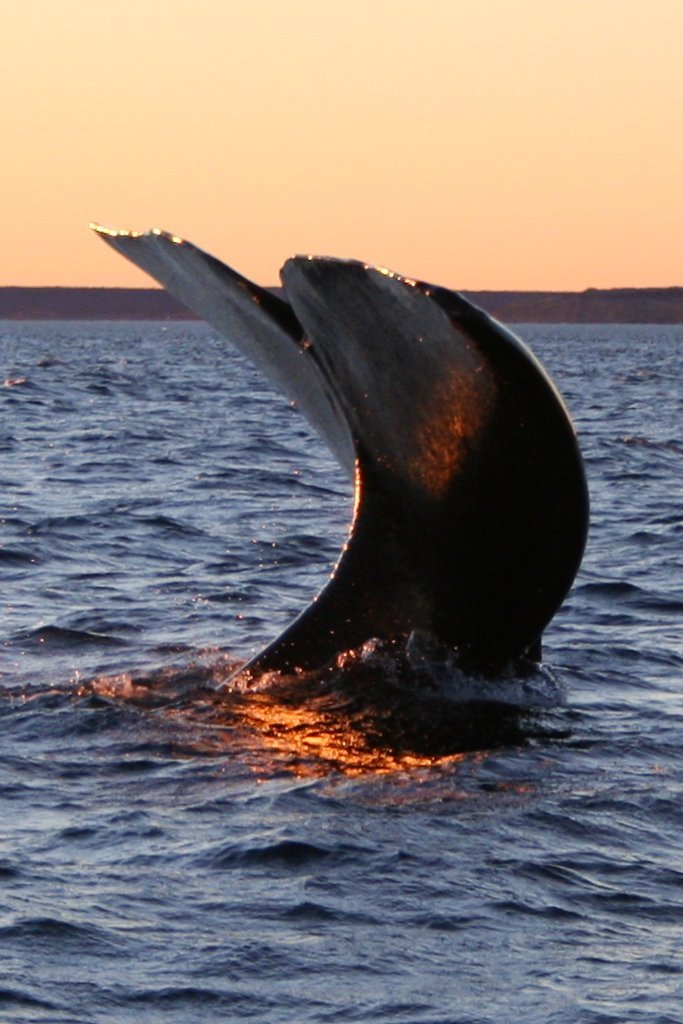
"Sailing"

Like other right whales, they are rather active on the water surface and curious towards human vessels. Southern rights appear to be more active and tend to interact with humans more than the other two northern species. One behaviour unique to the southern right whale, known as tail sailing, is that of using their elevated flukes to catch the wind, remaining in the same position for a considerable amount of time. It appears to be a form of play and is most commonly seen off the coast of Argentina and South Africa. Some other species such as humpback whales are also known to display. Right whales are often seen interacting with other cetaceans, especially humpback whales and dolphins. There have been records of southern rights and humpbacks thought to be involved in mating activities off Mozambique, and along Bahia, Brazil.

A female southern right whale was spotted off the coast of Western Australia accompanying a lone humpback whale calf, although the actual relationship of this pair is unclear.

=== Reproduction ===
Southern right whales display strong maternal fidelity to their calving grounds. Calving females are known to return to calving grounds at 3-year intervals. The most commonly observed calving interval is 3 years, but intervals can range from 2 to 21 years. Calving takes place between June and November in calving grounds between 20 and 30° S.

In Australia, southern right whales have shown a preference for calving grounds along coastlines with high wave energy, such as the Head of the Bight. Here, the sound of breaking waves may mask the sound of the whales' presence, and so protect infants and calving cows from predators such as killer whales. Deep waters alongside shallower calving grounds may serve as training grounds for calves to build up their stamina ahead of migration.

The age of sexual maturity for southern right whales is between 3 and 6 years. Females give birth to their first calf when they are between eight and ten years old. A single calf is born after a gestation period of one year, about 1 short ton (0.91 t) in weight and 4–6 m (13–20 ft) in length. The calf usually remains with its mother during the first year of its life, during which time it will double in length. A southern right whale with sex chromosome aneuploidy (XXY) has been reported.

Southern right whales have been observed nursing unrelated orphans on occasions. Southern right whales have been observed to have male to male penetration, with the behaviour being attributed to different possibilities: socialization, play, and reducing tension between males.

=== Predation ===
The only known predator of the southern right whale is the killer whale, There have been cases of adult killer whales hunting a southern right whale calf in Golfo San Jose, Argentina in 1986, and of killer whales hunting a newborn southern right whale in Balneario Quintão, off the northern coast of Rio Grande do Sul, Brazil, in July 2008.

=== Feeding ===
Like right whales in other oceans, southern right whales feed almost exclusively on zooplankton, particularly krill. They feed just beneath the water's surface, holding their mouths partly open and skimming water continuously while swimming. They strain the water out through their long baleen plates to capture their prey. A southern right whale's baleen can measure up to 2.8 m (9 ft 2 in) long, and is made up of 220–260 baleen plates.

== Population and distribution ==
The global population of southern right whales was estimated at 13,611 in 2009. An estimate published by National Geographic in October 2008 put the southern whale population at 10,000. A population estimate of 7,000 followed a March 1998 IWC workshop. Researchers used population data from three surveys of adult females in the 1990s (Argentina, South Africa and Australia). They extrapolated to include the population of unsurveyed areas, and used known male-to-female and adult-to-calf ratios to estimate and include numbers of males and calves. Recovery of the overall population size of the species is predicted to be at less than 50% of its pre-whaling state by 2100 due to heavier impacts of whaling and slower recovery rates. Since hunting ceased, the population is estimated to have grown by 7% a year.

The southern right whale spends summer in the far Southern Ocean feeding, probably close to Antarctica. If the opportunity arises, feeding can occur even in temperate waters such as along Buenos Aires. It migrates north in winter for breeding and can be seen by the coasts of Argentina, Australia, Brazil, Chile, Namibia, Mozambique, Peru, Tristan de Cunha, Uruguay, Madagascar, New Zealand and South Africa; whales have also been known to winter in sub-Antarctic regions. It appears that the South American, South African and Australasian groups intermix very little if at all, because maternal fidelity to feeding and calving habitats is very strong. The mother also passes these choices to her calves.

Right whales do not normally cross the warm equatorial waters to connect with the other species and (inter)breed: their thick layers of insulating blubber make it difficult for them to dissipate their internal body heat in tropical waters. Based on historical records and unconfirmed sightings in modern periods, E. australis transits may sometimes occur through equatorial waters.

Whaling records for the hemisphere include a whaling ground in the central northern Indian Ocean and recent sightings among near-equatorial regions. If the sighting off Kiribati was truly of E. australis, this species may have crossed the Equator on irregular occasions and their original distributions might have been much broader and more northerly distributed than is currently believed. A stranding of a 21.3 m (71 feet) right whale at Gajana, northwestern India in November 1944 was reported, but the true identity of this animal is unclear.

Aside from impacts on whales and environments caused by mankind, their distributions and residences could be largely affected by presences of natural predators or enemies, and similar trends are also probable for other subspecies.

Many locations throughout the Southern Hemisphere were named after current or former presences of southern rights, including Walvis Bay, Punta Ballena, Right Whale Bay, Otago Harbour, Whangarei Harbour, Foveaux Strait, South Taranaki Bight, Moutohora Island and Wineglass Bay.

=== Africa ===
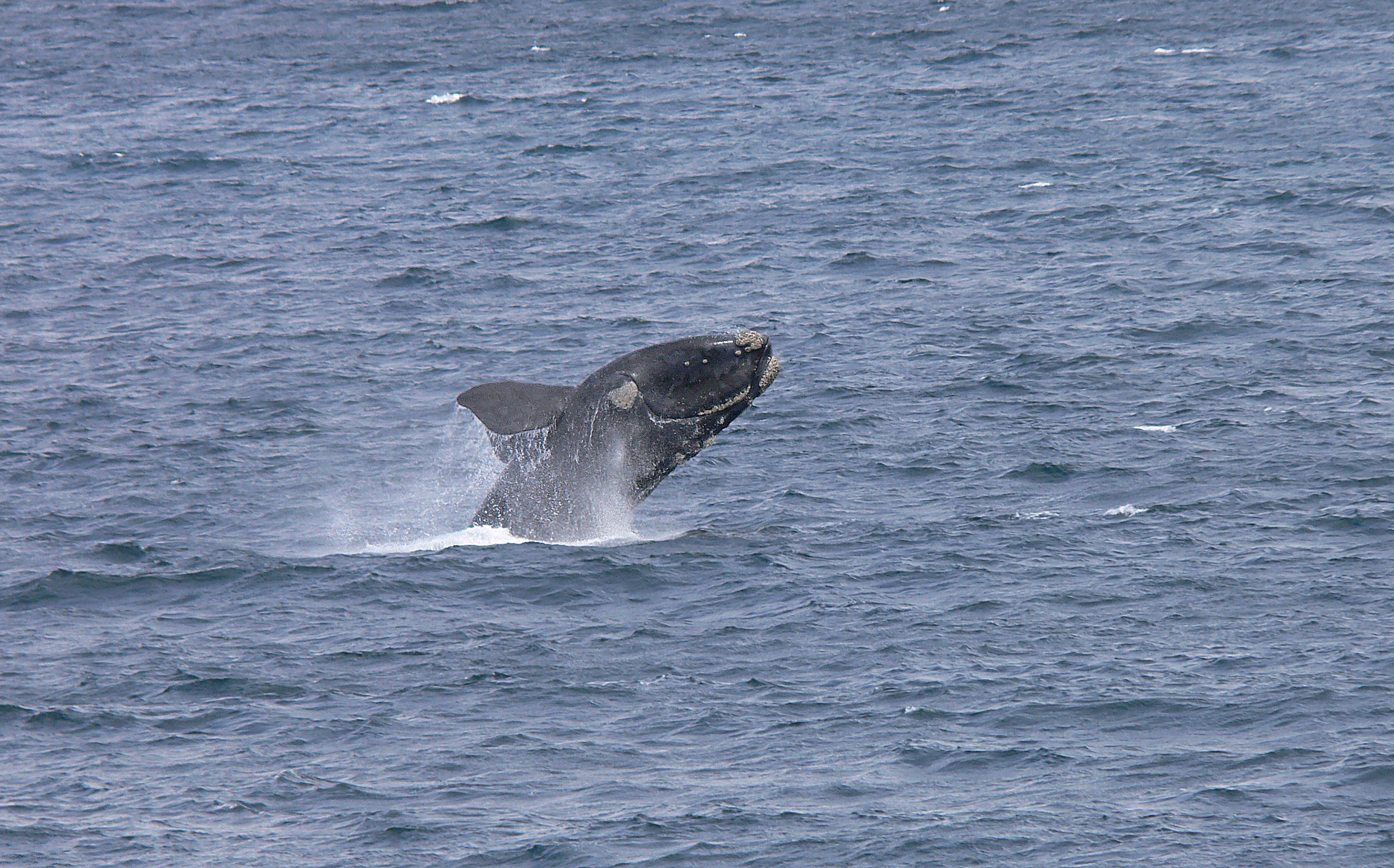
Breaching in the De Hoop Nature Reserve

A mating group in Hermanus Bay: one female and two males

==== South Africa ====
Hermanus in South Africa has become known as a centre for whale watching. During the Southern Hemisphere winter months (June – October) the southern right whales migrate to the coastal waters of South Africa, with more than 100 whales known to visit the Hermanus area. Whilst in the area, the whales can be seen with their young as they come to Walker Bay to calve and mate. Many behaviours such as breaching, sailing, lobtailing, or spyhopping can be witnessed. In False Bay whales can be seen from the shore from July to October while both Plettenberg Bay and Algoa Bay are also home to the southern right whales from July to December. They can be viewed from land as well as by boat with licensed operators conducting ocean safaris throughout the year.

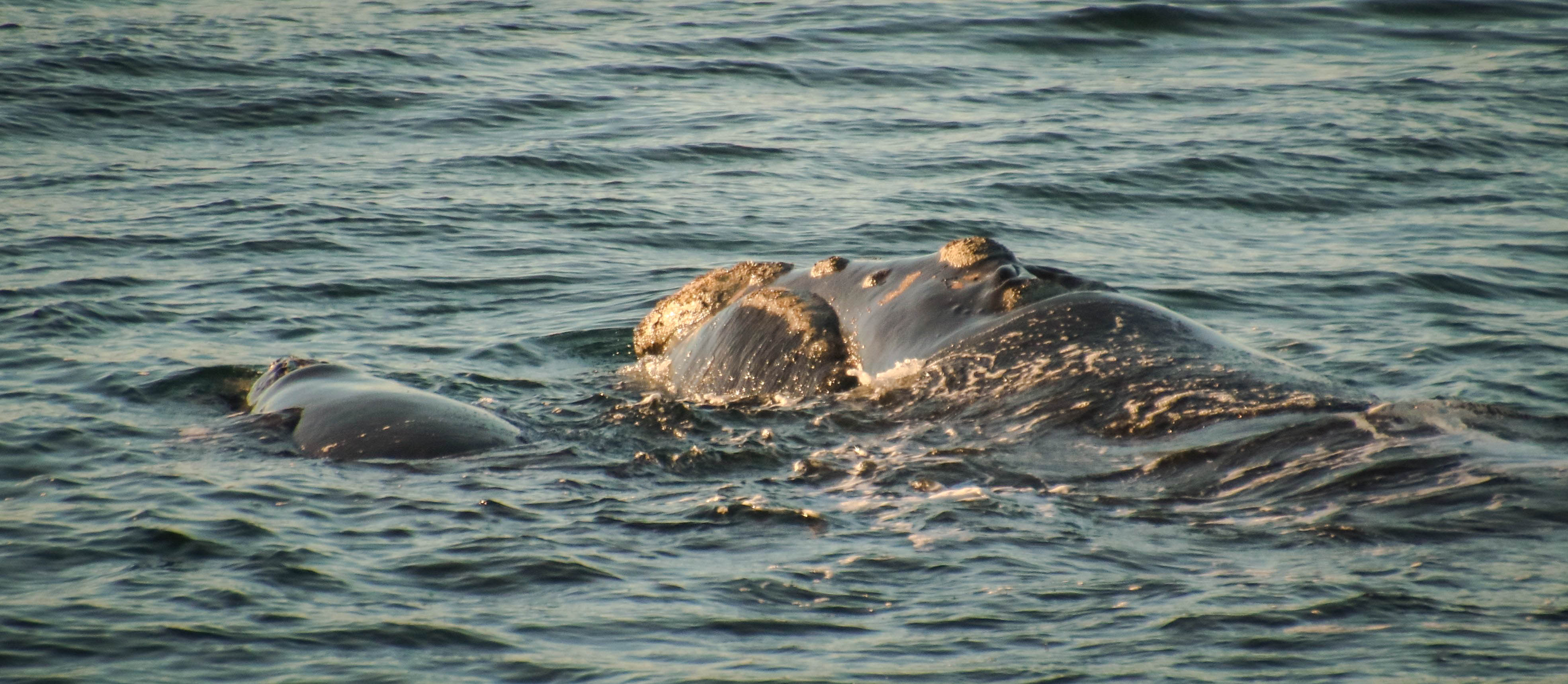
Mother and calf in Hermanus

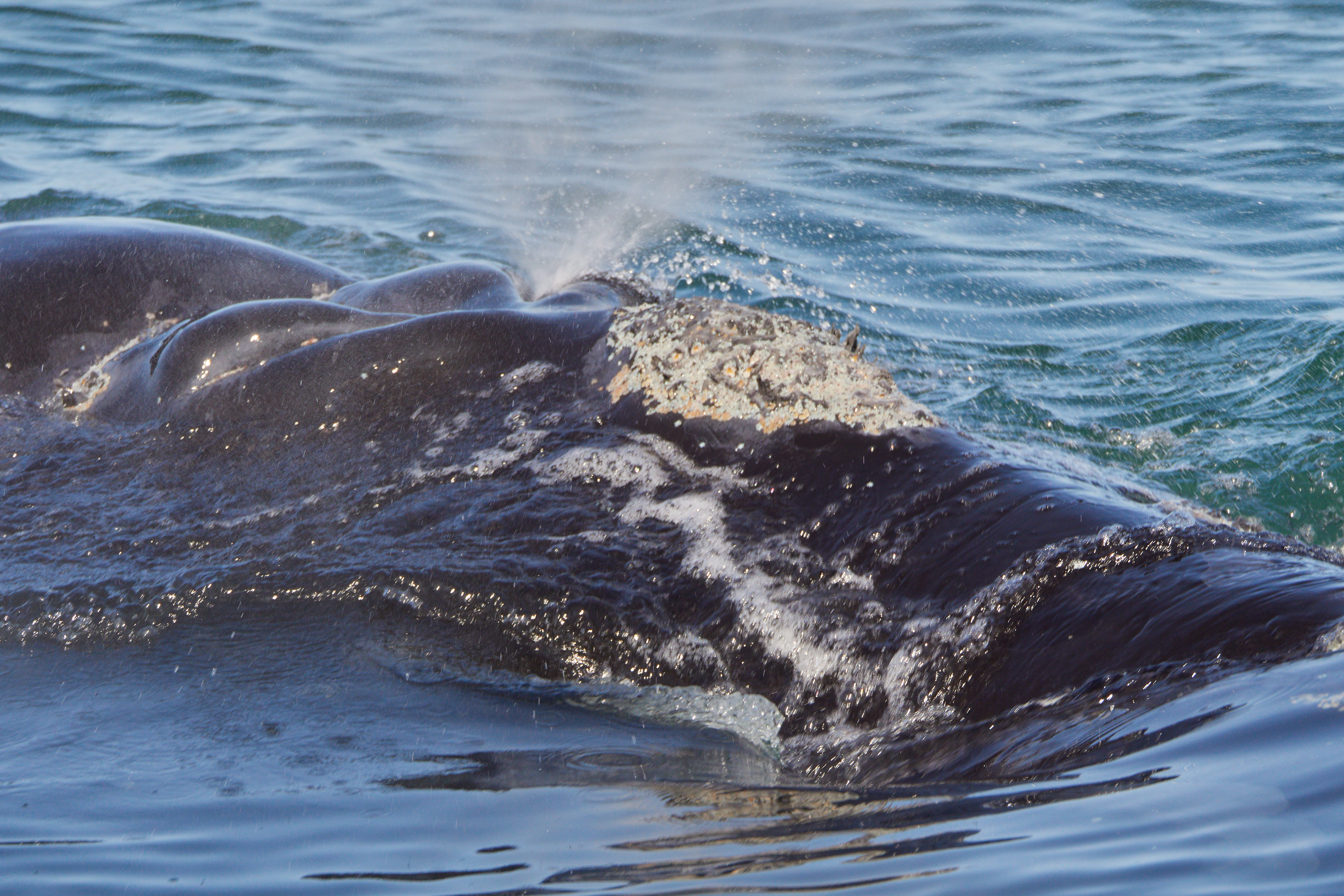
A southern right whale surfacing to breathe at Walker Bay, South Africa.

Whales have also been sighted visiting the north-eastern part of South Africa, the so-called Dolphin Coast such as around Ballito and off Umdloti Beach, indicates the whales' normal ranges are expanding and that re-colonising historical habitats will likely continue as more whales migrate further north.

==== Western Africa ====
In Namibia, the majority of confirmed whales are restricted to the south of Luderitz, on the southwestern coast. Only a handful of animals venture further north to historical breeding grounds such as at Walvis Bay, but their numbers are slowly increasing. Until illegal hunting ceased, whales were rare along Namibian shores, with no sighting recorded north of Orange River until 1971. Calving activities were first confirmed as recently as the 1980s.

Historical records suggest that this whale's regular range could have once reached further northwards up the coasts of Cape Fria (northern Namibia) and Angola as far as Baia dos Tigres (Tiger Bay).

Whaling is known to have been carried out off the coast of Gabon, for example at Cape Lopez, and there have been a few confirmed and unconfirmed sightings including one by Jim Darling, a renowned whale researcher.

==== Eastern Africa ====
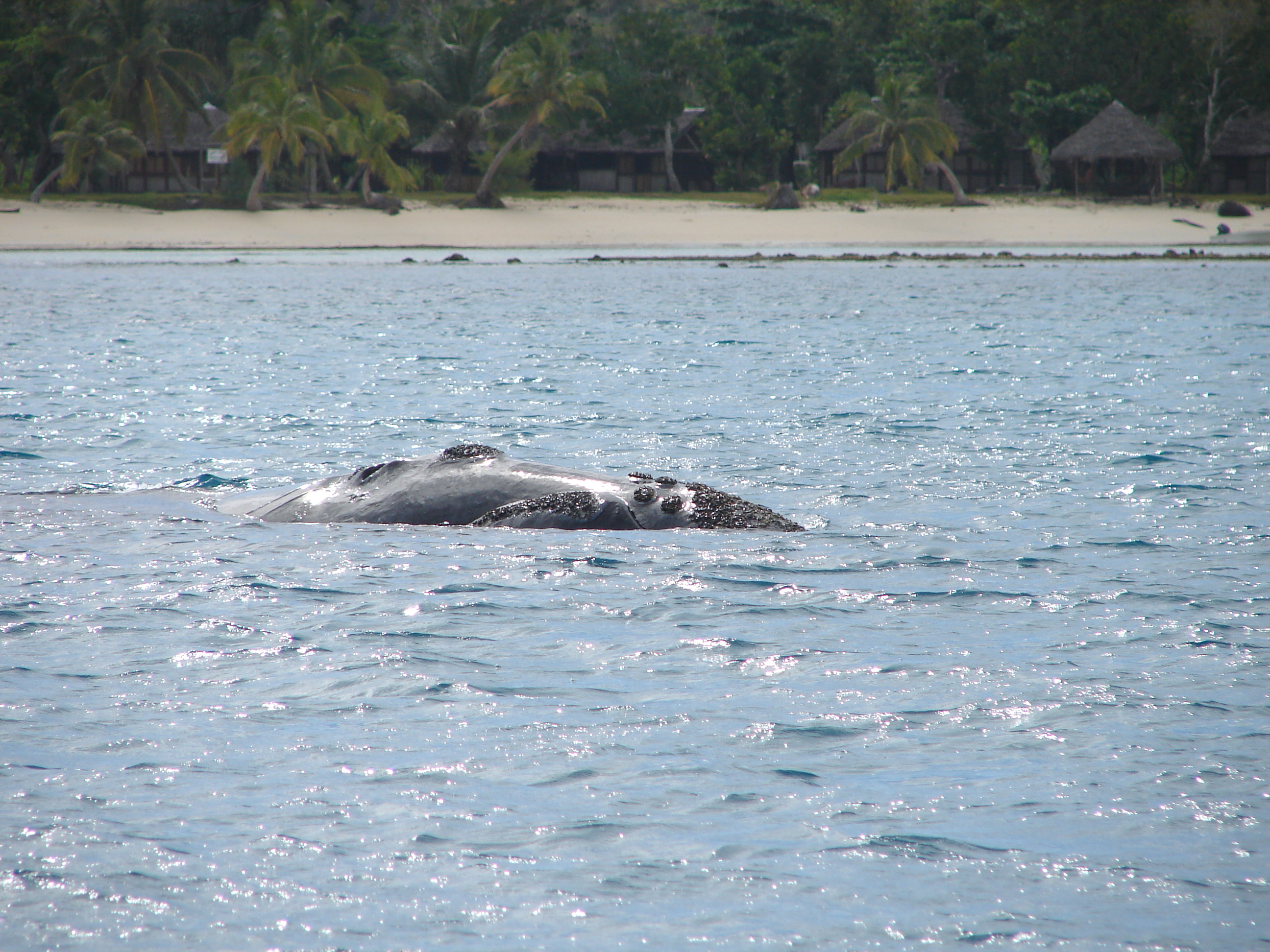
Rare appearance along Madagascar at Île Sainte-Marie

Southern right whales have been spotted in very small numbers off Mozambique and Madagascar. Whales were historically seen in large numbers at various locations such as off the coast of Durban, in Delagoa/Maputo Bay, Inhaca Island, Ponta do Ouro, and around the Bazaruto Archipelago. The first sighting off Mozambique since the end of whaling was in 1997. In recent years, more whales seem to migrate further north to calve, such as at Île Sainte-Marie, Antongil Bay, Fort Dauphin Toliara, Anakao, Andavadoaka, and Antsiranana Bay, at Madagascar's northern tip. Infrequent sightings have been confirmed off the island of Mayotte. Whales were historically taken off the coast of Tanzania, and may still be present occasionally around Zanzibar.

==== Mid–South Atlantic ====
Due to illegal whaling by the USSR, the recovery of many stocks including the population off Tristan da Cunha and adjacent areas such as Gough Island has been severely hindered, resulting in relatively few numbers of visiting animals.

Based on catch records and recent observations, right whales may be seen as far north as the islands of Saint Helena and Ascension Island.

=== South America ===
==== Brazil ====
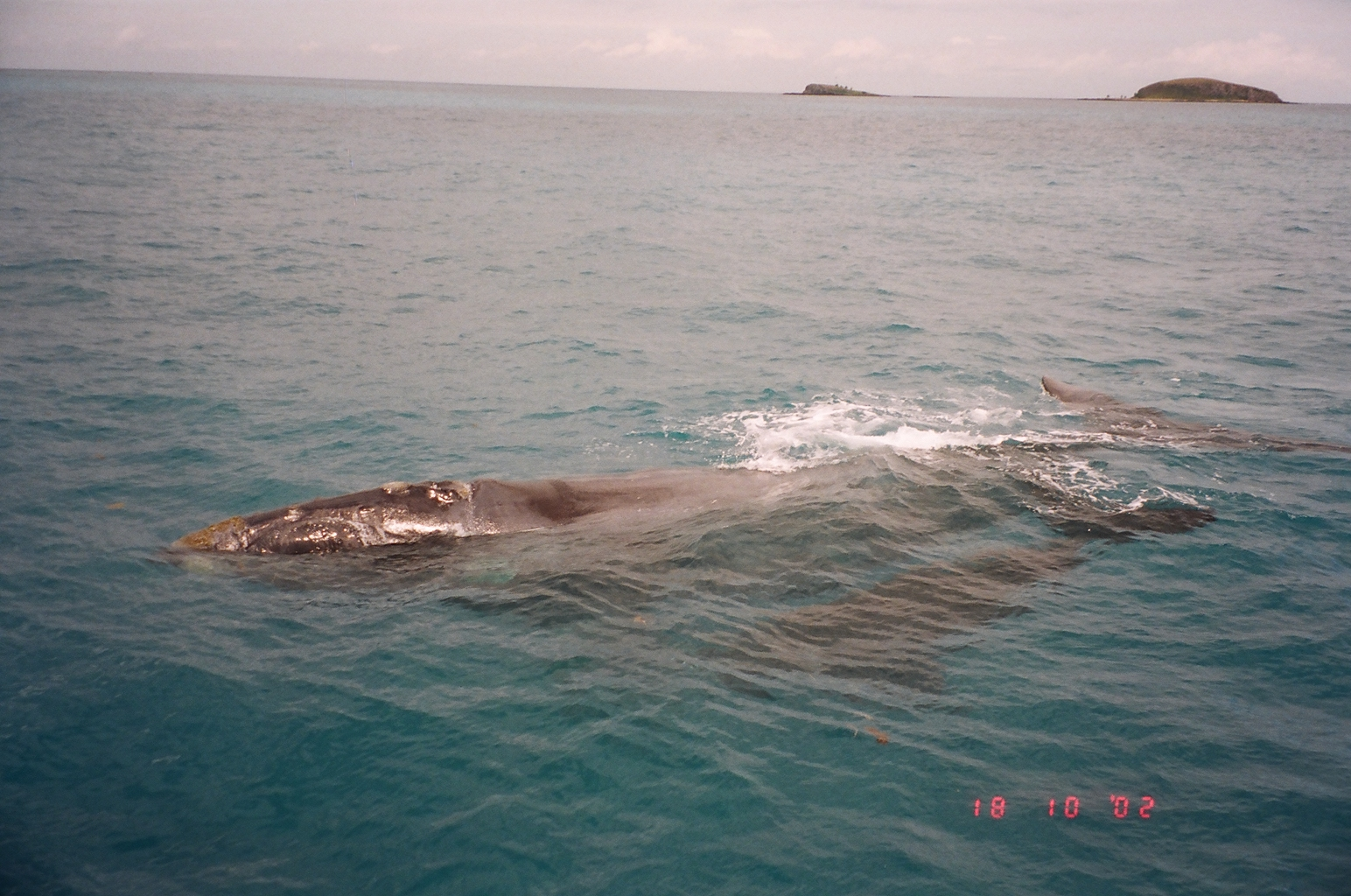
Cow–calf pair in the Abrolhos Archipelago, Brazil

In Brazil, more than 300 individuals have been cataloged through photo identification (using head callosities) by the Brazilian Right Whale Project, maintained jointly by Petrobras (the Brazilian state-owned oil company), and the conservation group, the International Wildlife Coalition. The State of Santa Catarina hosts a concentration of breeding and calving right whales from June to November, and females from this population also calve off Argentinian Patagonia and Uruguay. In recent years, possibly due to changing habitat environments by human activities and conflicts with local fisheries, the number of whales visiting the coasts is decreasing. Sighting in locations other than Santa Catarina and Rio Grande do Sul remain sporadic, such as along Cidreira, Rio de Janeiro coasts like Sepetiba Bay (pt), Cabo Frio, Macaé, Prado, Bahia, Castelhanos Bay in Ilha Bela, São Paulo coasts such as within Ilha Anchieta State Park, Honey Island, and bays and estuaries of Paranaguá and Superagui National Park, Paraná, and even entering into the lagoon of Lagoa dos Patos. Recent studies also show a decrease in the number of sightings along the southeastern Brazilian coast, which includes the highly urbanized States of São Paulo and Rio de Janeiro.

Further north, small numbers of whales migrate every year to winter or calve in Bahia, in particular at the Abrolhos Archipelago. Here, certain individuals are recorded returning at intervals of 3 or 4 years. Whaling records including those prior to Maury and Townsend indicate that right whales were once more frequent visitors further north, for example at Salvador, Bahia.

==== Argentina ====
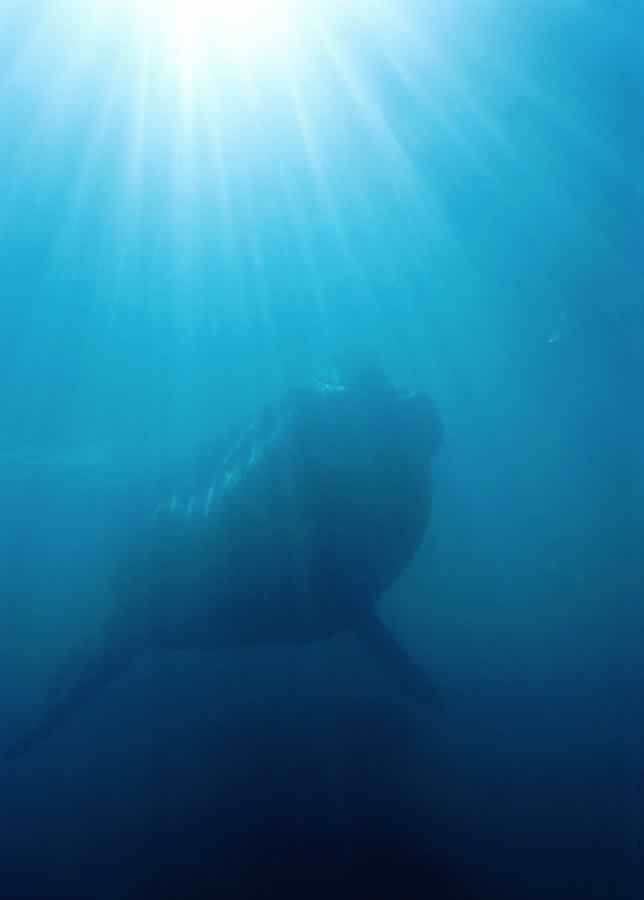
A right whale submerges off Valdes Peninsula

Argentina hosts the world's largest breeding population of southern right whales at Península Valdés, Chubut province, with over 2000 estimated individuals gathering on the gulfs of the peninsula during breeding season. The whales are considered a "natural monument" and protected under Argentine law, and there is a developed whale-watching tourism around them.

During the 2012 annual meeting of the International Whaling Commission's Scientific Committee, data was presented regarding the continued phenomenon of southern right whale strandings and high rate of mortality at Península Valdés. Between 2003 and 2011, a total of 482 dead right whales were recorded at Península Valdés. There were at least 55 whale deaths in 2010, and 61 in 2011. As in previous years, the vast majority of strandings were calves of the season. There have been increasing sightings in various other locations in recent years, such as on Golfo San Jorge, Tierra del Fuego, Puerto Deseado, Mar del Plata, Miramar, Buenos Aires, and Bahía Blanca.

==== Uruguay ====
In Uruguay, coastal areas such as Punta del Este host congregating sites for whales in breeding seasons, but these are not likely to be calving grounds.

In 2013 the Uruguayan parliament approved unanimously the creation of the Uruguayan Whale and Dolphin Sanctuary to aid the recovery of the population. The sanctuary encompasses the entire Uruguayan Territorial Waters and Exclusive Economic Zone covering a total of 125,436 km^{2}.

==== Chile and Peru ====
For the critically endangered Chile/Peru population, the Cetacean Conservation Center (CCC) has been working on a separate programme for right whales. This population, containing no more than 50 individuals, is under threat from an increase in shipping lanes and the fishing industries. 124 sightings in total were recorded during the period 1964–2008. Aside from vagrants' records, Peru's coastlines possibly host one of the northernmost confirmed range of the species along with Gabon, Senegal, Tanzania, Brazilian coasts, Madagascar, Indian Ocean, western Australia, Kermadec Islands, and tropical waters including South Pacific Islands. The Alfaguara project targeting cetaceans in Chiloe may possibly target this species as well in the future since calving activities have been confirmed in Chiloé Archipelago. Foraging grounds of this population is currently undetected, but possibly Chiloé and down south of Caleta Zorra to southern fiords such as from Penas Gulf to Beagle Channel although numbers of confirmations are small in the Beagle Channel. Hopes are arising for the establishment of a new tourism industry on the eastern side of the Strait of Magellan, especially near Cape Virgenes and Punta Dungeness, as the number of sightings increases. It is unknown whether these increases are due to re-colonisation by whales from the Patagonian population.

Occurrences of brindle individuals have been confirmed from this population as well.

=== Oceania ===
Historically, populations of southern right whales in Oceanian regions were robust. Early settlers of the River Derwent in Tasmania complained that sounds of cavorting whales kept them awake at night. (Similar stories exist about Wellington, New Zealand, but no primary sources could be found to support them.) In July 1804, clergyman Robert Knopwood claimed that in crossing the River Derwent, "we passed so many whales that it was dangerous for the boat to go up the river unless you kept very near the shore". By the 1890s southern right whales had been brought to the brink of extinction, with over 25,000 whales killed in Australia and New Zealand.

Studies of population structure and mating systems have shown that the southwest Australian and New Zealand populations are genetically differentiated. The results of satellite tracking suggest that there are at least some interactions between populations in Australia and New Zealand, but the extent of this is unknown. The two groups may share migratory corridors and calving grounds. The return of southern right whales to the Derwent River and other parts of Australia in recent decades is a sign that they are slowly recovering from their earlier exploitation to near extinction.

==== Australia ====
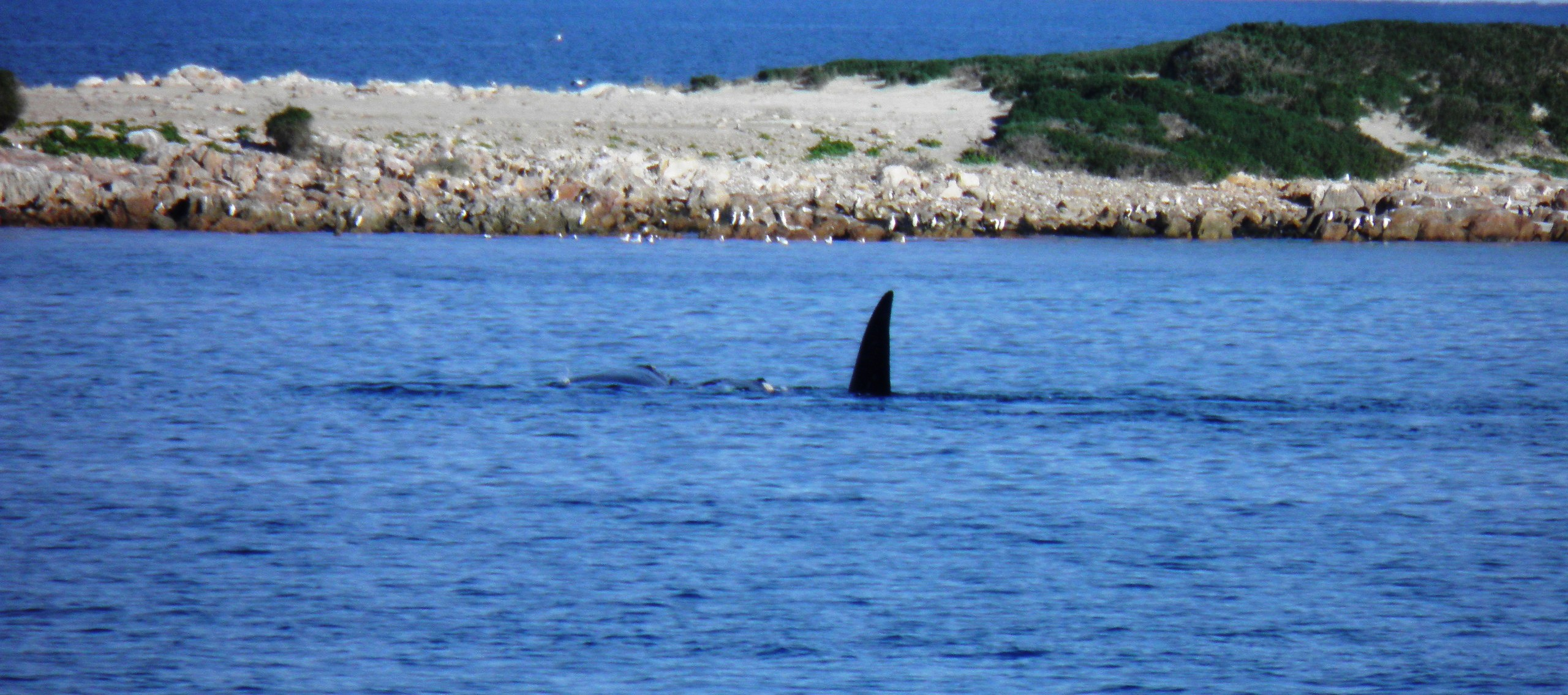
In Lipson Cove, Spencer Gulf

Southern right whales in Australian waters show higher rate of recoveries, as they have increased from 2,100 whales in 2008 to 3,500 in 2010. Two genetically distinct groups inhabit Australian waters: the southwestern population of 2,900 whales – in 2012 currently holding the majority of the overall Australian population – and the critically endangered southeastern group, counting only dozens to 300 individuals.

===== South Australia =====
Right whales can be found in many parts of southern Australia, where the largest population is found at the Head of the Bight in South Australia, a sparsely populated area south of the middle of the Nullarbor Plain. Over 100 individuals are seen there annually from June to October. Visitors can view the whales from cliff-top boardwalks and lookouts, with whales swimming almost directly below, or by taking a scenic flight over the marine park. A more accessible South Australian location for viewing whales is Encounter Bay where the whales can be seen just off the beaches of the Fleurieu Peninsula, centred around the surfing town of Middleton. The whales have established a newer nursery-ground near Eyre Peninsula, especially at Fowlers Bay. Numbers are much smaller at these locations compared to those in the Bight, with an average of a couple of whales per day, but as of 2009 there were regular sightings of more than ten whales at a time off Basham Beach, near Middleton. The South Australian Whale Centre at Victor Harbor has information on the history of whaling and whale-watching in the area, and maintains an on-line database of whale sightings. In June 2021 a female gave birth off Christies Beach, a southern suburb of Adelaide, and remained in the shallows off the beach for some time, attracting large crowds.

===== Victoria and Tasmania =====
Whale numbers are scarcer in Victoria, where the only established breeding ground which whales use each year, in very small numbers, is at Warrnambool. However, as the whales do seem to be increasing in number generally, but not showing any dramatic increases at Warrnambool, they may be extending their wintering habitats into other areas of Victoria, where the numbers of sightings are slowly increasing. These areas include around Melbourne, such as in Port Phillip Bay, along Waratah Bay, at Ocean Grove, Warrnambool, on Mornington Peninsula, in Apollo Bay, and on Gippsland coasts and at Wilsons Promontory.

Whale numbers in Tasmania are relatively small, however sightings have increased in recent years. Some whales migrate through Tasmanian waters while some others remain throughout wintering seasons.

===== Other states and territories =====
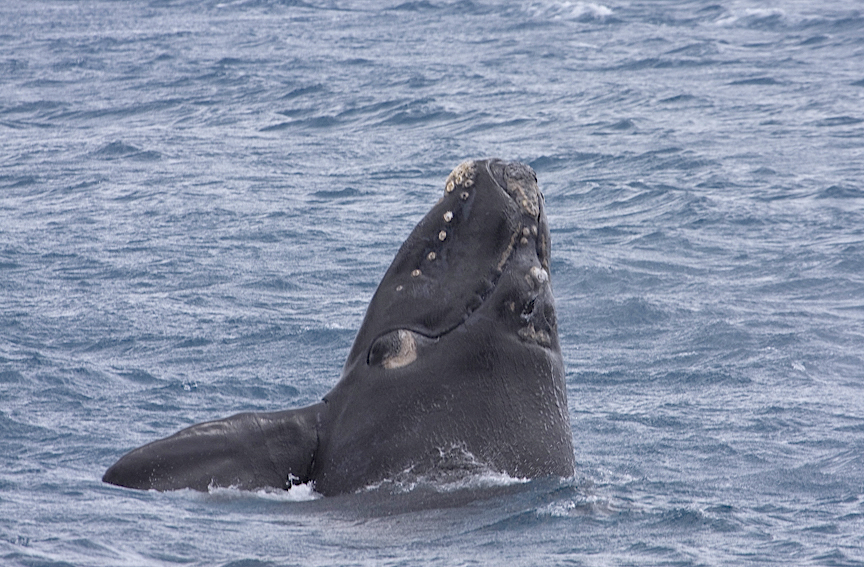
In Waychinicup National Park

Waters off the coasts of Western Australia, New South Wales, and Queensland coasts have all historically been inhabited by whales. Their historical range was much wider than it is today, and reached around the southern coast of the continent, extending up to Australian Abrolhos Island, Exmouth and Shark Bay on the west coast, and on the east coast as far north as Hervey Bay, Moreton Bay and Great Barrier Reef. Today, the east-coast population remains endangered and very small (in the low-tens), contributing to small numbers and limited re-colonization, but increases have been confirmed in many areas such as Port Jackson, Port Stephens, Twofold Bay, Jervis Bay, Broulee, Moruya River, Narooma, and Byron Bay. 12 foraging areas have been officially announced by the Australian government.

In sub-Antarctic regions, numbers of whales visiting long-used habitats differ drastically by location. The population is recovering well at the New Zealand Subantarctic Islands, while whale numbers are less successful at Macquarie Island.

It is not known whether Australian populations will re-colonise historical oceanic habitats such as Norfolk Island and Lord Howe Island with Lord Howe Seamount Chain (historically known as the "Middle Ground" for whalers) in the future.

==== New Zealand ====
The current population of right whales in New Zealand waters is difficult to establish. However, studies by the Department of Conservation and sightings reported by locals have helped to build up a better picture. The pre-exploitation size of the New Zealand group is estimated at between 28,800 and 47,100 whales. 35,000 – 41,000 catches were made between 1827 and 1980. The number of whales surviving commercial and illegal whaling operations is estimated to have decreased to just 110 whales (around 30 of which were females) in 1915. As a result of such a steep decline in numbers, the population of southern right whales in this region has experienced a population bottleneck and suffers from low genetic diversity.

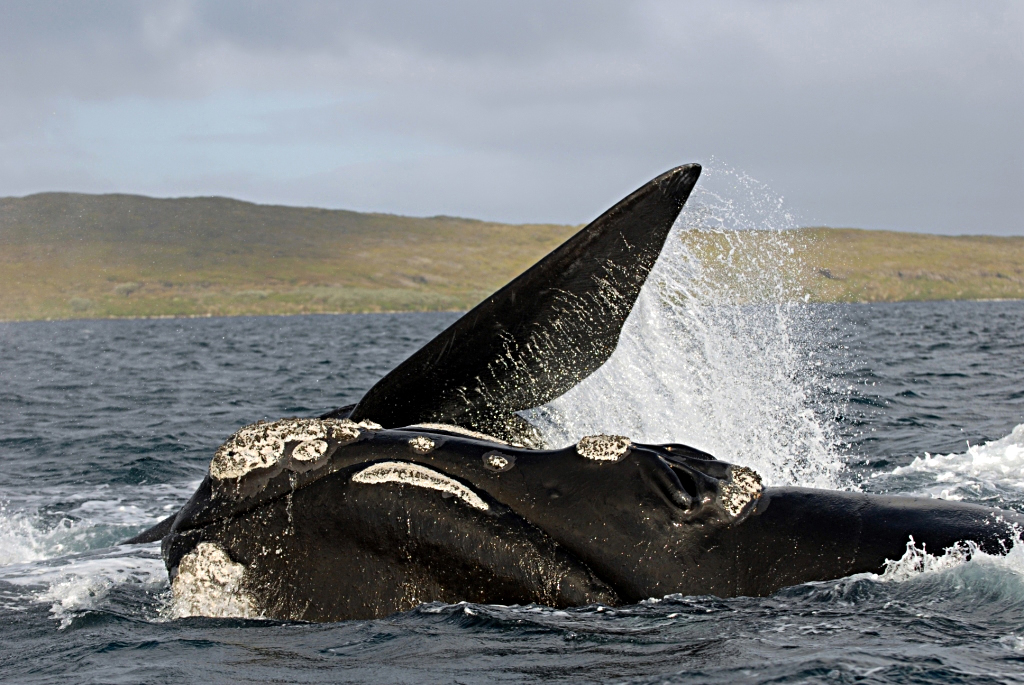
In Port Ross, Auckland Islands

The population at the sub-Antarctic Auckland Islands is showing a remarkable recovery but continues to have some of the lowest genetic diversities in the world. In the Campbell Islands, recovery is slower. Here, the population is estimated to have dropped to as low as 20 individuals post WWII. There had been no confirmed sightings or strandings of right whales for 36 years until 1963 when four separate sightings including a cow-calf pair were made over a wide area. Remnants of sub-Antarctic populations were reported in the 1980s and re-discovered in the 1990s.

Today, the majority of right whales congregate at the Auckland and Campbell Islands, where they form exceptionally dense and limited congregations including mating adults and calving females. In the waters around Port Ross up to 200 whales may winter at the same time. It is notable that whales of all age groups are present in this small area annually, not only using them as feeding and summering grounds but also for wintering, breeding, and calving during harsh, cold periods. Low genetic diversity as a result of population decline has caused changes in skin coloration amongst this group. Scientists used to believe there was a very small remnant population of southern right whales inhabiting New Zealand's main islands (North and South Island), estimated to contain 11 reproductive females. In winter, whales migrate north to New Zealand waters and large concentrations occasionally visit the southern coasts of South Island. Bay areas along Foveaux Strait from Fiordland region to northern Otago are important breeding habitats for right whales, especially Preservation, Chalky Inlets, Te Waewae Bay, and Otago Peninsula. Calving activities are observed all around New Zealand, but with more regularity around North Island shores from the Taranaki coast in the west to Hawke's Bay, Bay of Plenty in the east, and areas in Hauraki Gulf such as Firth of Thames or Bay of Islands in the north.

There are various parts of the nation where large numbers of whales were seen historically, but sightings are less common nowadays. These areas include the Marlborough Region, especially from Clifford Bay and Cloudy Bay to Port Underwood, Golden Bay, Awaroa Bay, and coastlines on West Coast and Hokianga Harbour in Northland. Other than a handful of confirmed observations, very little information is available for modern migrations to historical oceanic habitats of Kermadec Islands and Chatham Islands. The northernmost sighting recorded historically was at 27°S.

A 2009 study revealed that the right whale populations from New Zealand's main islands and the sub-Antarctic islands interbreed, though it is still unknown whether the two stock originally came from a single population. Feeding areas in pelagic waters are unclear while congregations have been confirmed along the southern edge of the Chatham Rise.

Some Australian ranges are located close to the ranges of New Zealand groups (Norfolk Island, Macquarie Island). It is unclear whether whales historically or currently from these Australian ranges once originated in New Zealand groups.

=== Other ===
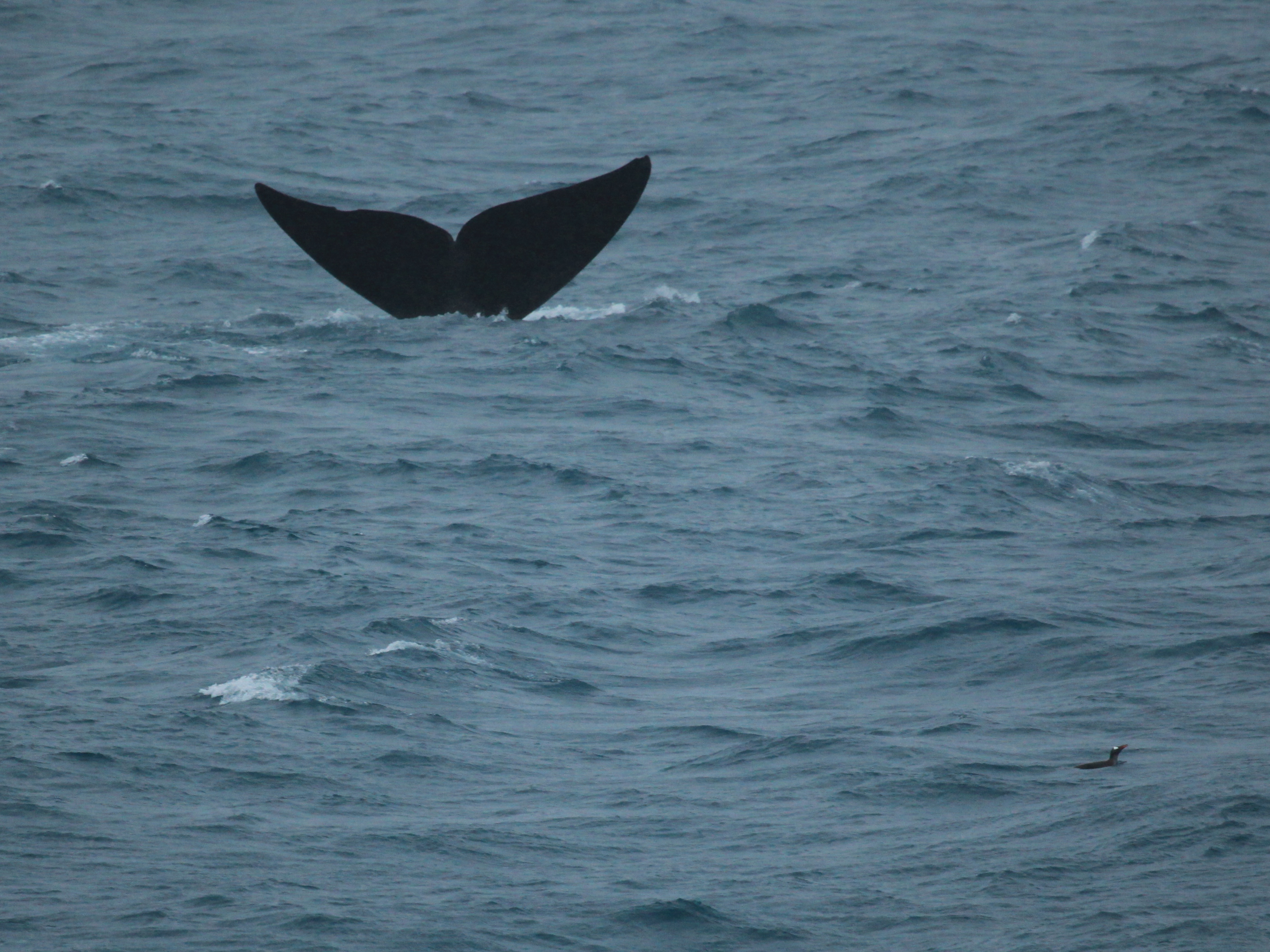
Fluking off South Georgia near a gentoo penguin

In oceanic islands and offshore waters other than the above-mentioned areas, very little about the presence and recovery status of southern right whales is known. Right whales' historical ranges were much greater than today; during the whaling era of the 19th century whales were known to occur in lower latitude areas such as around the Pacific Islands, off the Gilbert Islands (nowadays Kiribati), and also to frequent lower latitudes of the central Indian Ocean.

It is unclear whether right whales have been historically or currently distributed among parts of hemisphere lacking great land masses and reached far more pelagic islands such as Alejandro Selkirk and Robinson Crusoe Islands, Hanga Roa, Pitcairn, Galapagos Islands, and the Easter Island.

Populations among sub-Antarctic islands in the Scotia Sea such as South Georgia and the South Sandwich Islands and Falkland Islands were severely damaged and show slower recoveries today. Antarctic distributions are difficult to establish due to low levels of sightings around oceanic islands in these areas, including Elephant Island. (Note: Not to be confused with Elephanta Island, Elephant Jason Island, or Elephantine Island)

==== Indian Ocean ====
Historically, there were known to be populations which summered in the Crozet Islands and the Kerguelen Islands, and migrated to La Roche Godon and Île Saint-Paul, Île Amsterdam, and the Central Indian Ocean. They may be distinct from the population of whales seen on Mozambique coasts. Repopulation of whales among these areas of the Indian Ocean is likely to be happening at even lower rates than in other areas. Sightings have been fewer in modern periods among Crozet, Réunion, Mauritius, Marion Islands, Île Amsterdam, and Kerguelen.

Killings of these whales have been recorded on central Indian Ocean near the equator, especially around the area between Diego Garcia, Egmont Islands, and the Great Chagos Bank in the west, and the Cocos (Keeling) Islands in the east. The range of whales in the Indian Ocean is comparable to the range of some other populations around South America, Africa, and the South Pacific islands including Kiribati, the northernmost reach of all the populations known today.

== Whaling ==
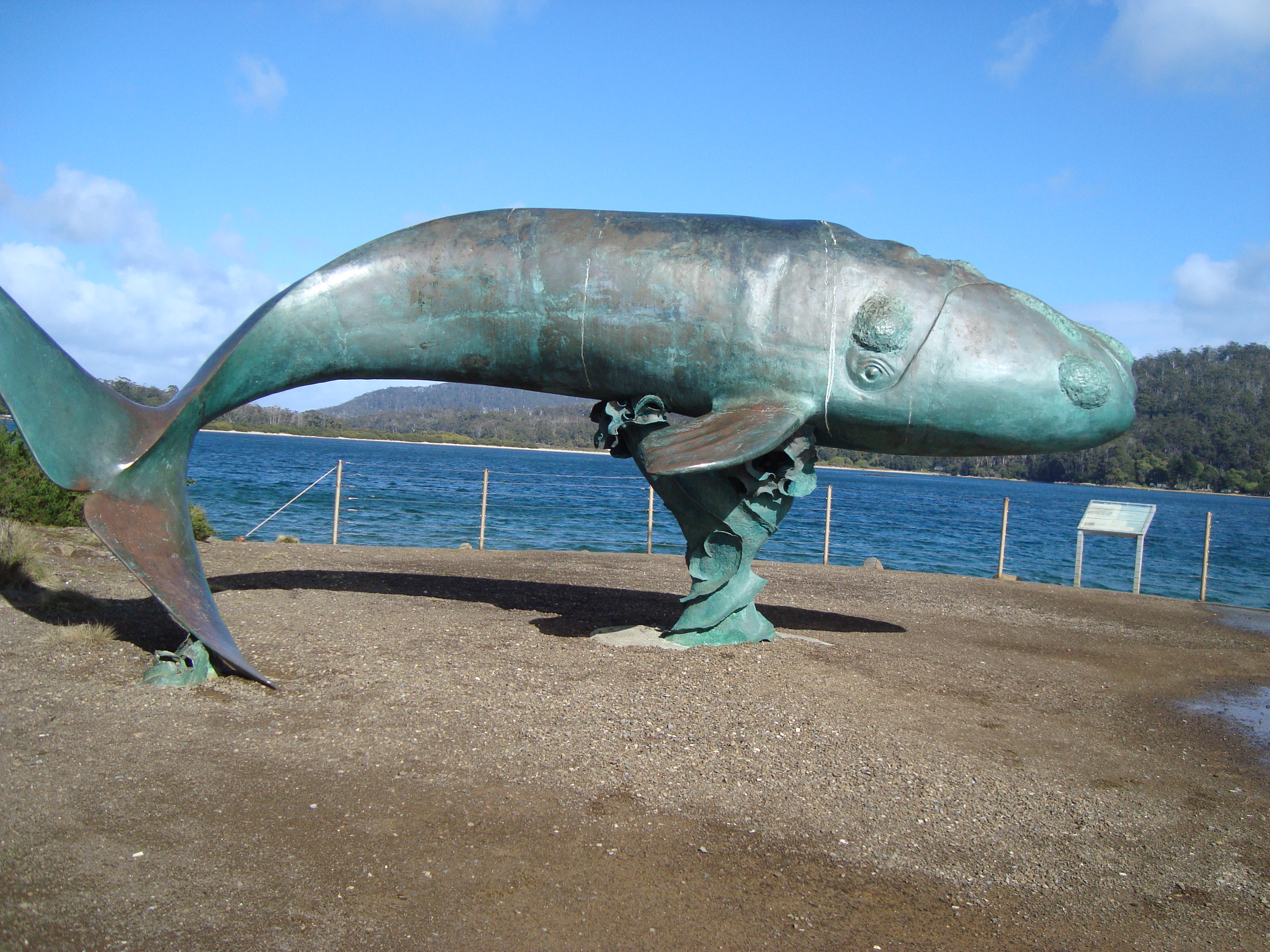
Sculpture of southern right whale at Cockle Creek on Recherche Bay, Tasmania, where bay whaling was performed extensively during the 1840s and 1850s

By 1750 the North Atlantic right whale was as good as extinct for commercial purposes, and the American whalers moved into the South Atlantic before the end of the 18th century. The most southerly Brazilian whaling station was established in 1796, in Imbituba. Over the next hundred years, American whaling spread into the Southern and Pacific Oceans, where the American fleet was joined by fleets from several European nations.

The southern right whale had been coming to Australian and New Zealand waters in large numbers before the 19th century, but was extensively hunted from 1800 to 1850. Hunting gradually declined with the whale population and then all but ended in coastal waters in Australasia. The beginning of the 20th century brought industrial whaling, and the catch grew rapidly. By 1937, according to whalers' records, 38,000 were harpooned in the South Atlantic, 39,000 in the South Pacific, and 1,300 in the Indian Ocean. Given the incompleteness of these records, the total take was somewhat higher.

As it became clear that the population was nearly depleted, the harpooning of right whales was banned in 1937. The ban was largely successful, although some illegal whaling continued for several decades. Madeira took its last two right whales in 1968. Illegal whaling continued off the coast of Brazil for years, and the Imbituba station processed right whales until 1973. The USSR admitted to taking illegally over 3,300 during the 1950s and 1960s, although it only reported taking 4.

Illegal operations continued even in the 1970s, such as the case in Brazil until 1973. It was also revealed that Japan was supporting these destructive hunts by neglecting and disregarding its monitoring obligations. There were agreements between Japan and the Soviet Union to keep their illegal mass whaling activities in foreign/international protected waters secret.

Right whales began to be seen again in Australian and New Zealand waters from the early 1960s. It is possible that if the Soviet hunts had never happened, the New Zealand population would be three or four times larger than its current size.

== Conservation ==
The southern right whale, listed as "endangered" by CITES, is protected by all countries with known breeding populations (Argentina, Australia, Brazil, Chile, New Zealand, South Africa and Uruguay). In Argentina, it is considered a "Natural Monument" under national law Nº 23094, with all whales sighted on Argentine waters under legal protection. In Brazil, a federal Environmental Protection Area encompassing some 1,560 km^{2} (600 mi^{2}) and 130 km (81 mi) of coastline in Santa Catarina State was established in 2000 to protect the species' main breeding grounds in Brazil and promote regulated whale watching. The southern right whale is listed on Appendix I of the Convention on the Conservation of Migratory Species of Wild Animals (CMS) as this species has been categorized as being in danger of extinction throughout all or a significant proportion of their range. This species is also covered by the Memorandum of Understanding for the Conservation of Cetaceans and Their Habitats in the Pacific Islands Region (Pacific Cetaceans MoU). In 2017, the IUCN Red List of Threatened Species listed the species' status as Least Concern with a population trend listed as "unknown".

In Australia, Southern right whales are listed for protection variously under state and federal legislation, as reflected in the table below:

Threatened species listing status in Australia by jurisdiction
Jurisdiction	Status	Legislation	Year of last revision	Reference
Australia	Endangered	EPBC Act 1999	2000	
Western Australia	Vulnerable	Biodiversity Conservation Act 2016		
South Australia	Vulnerable	National Parks & Wildlife Act 1972		
Victoria	Threatened	Flora & Fauna Guarantee Act 1988		
Tasmania	Endangered	Threatened Species Protection Act 1995		

A two-year, £740,000 project, led by the British Antarctic Survey began in 2016, to discover why almost 500 young have been washed up on the Valdes Peninsula over the last ten years. The project is funded by the UK's Department for Environment, Food and Rural Affairs (Defra) and the EU. Possible reasons are a lack of krill in the whale feeding grounds at South Georgia and the South Sandwich Islands, exposure to toxic algae and attacks by kelp gulls (Larus dominicanus).

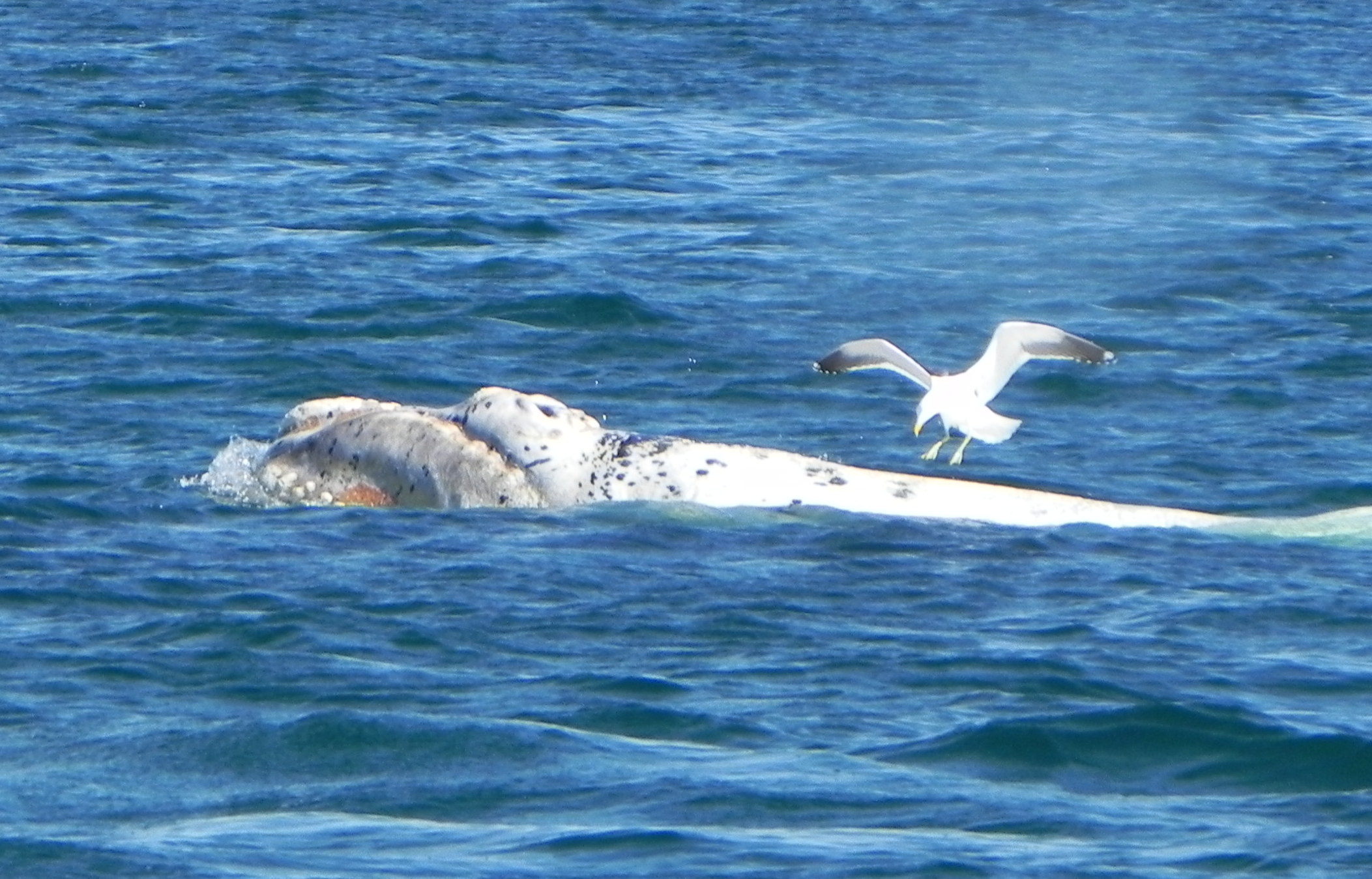
A white calf attacked by a gull off Península Valdés

=== Gull attacks ===
One possibly significant contributor to the calf mortality rate has alarmed scientists – since at least 1996, kelp gulls off the coast of Patagonia have been observed attacking and feeding on live right whales. The kelp gull uses its powerful beak to peck down several centimetres into the skin and blubber, often leaving the whales with large open sores – some of which have been observed to be half a metre in diameter. This predatory behaviour, primarily targeted towards mother/calf pairs, has been continually documented in Argentinian waters, and continues today. Observers note that the whales are spending up to a third of their time and energy performing evasive manoeuvres – therefore, mothers spend less time nursing, and the calves are thinner and weaker as a result. Researchers speculate that many years ago, waste from fish processing plants allowed the gull populations to soar. Their resulting overpopulation, combined with reduced waste output, caused the gulls to seek out this alternative food source. Scientists fear that the gulls' learned behaviour could proliferate, and the IWC Scientific Committee has urged Brazil to consider taking immediate action if and when similar gull behaviour is observed in their waters. Such action may include the removal of attacking gulls, following Argentina's lead in attempting to reverse the trend.

=== Threats ===
Southern right whales are threatened by entanglement in commercial fishing gear and ship strikes. Entanglement in fishing gear can cut through a whale's skin, causing infection, amputation and death. Underwater noise from human activities such as drilling and dredging can interfere with whales' communication, and deter them from their usual habitats and breeding grounds.

== Whale watching ==
=== Africa ===
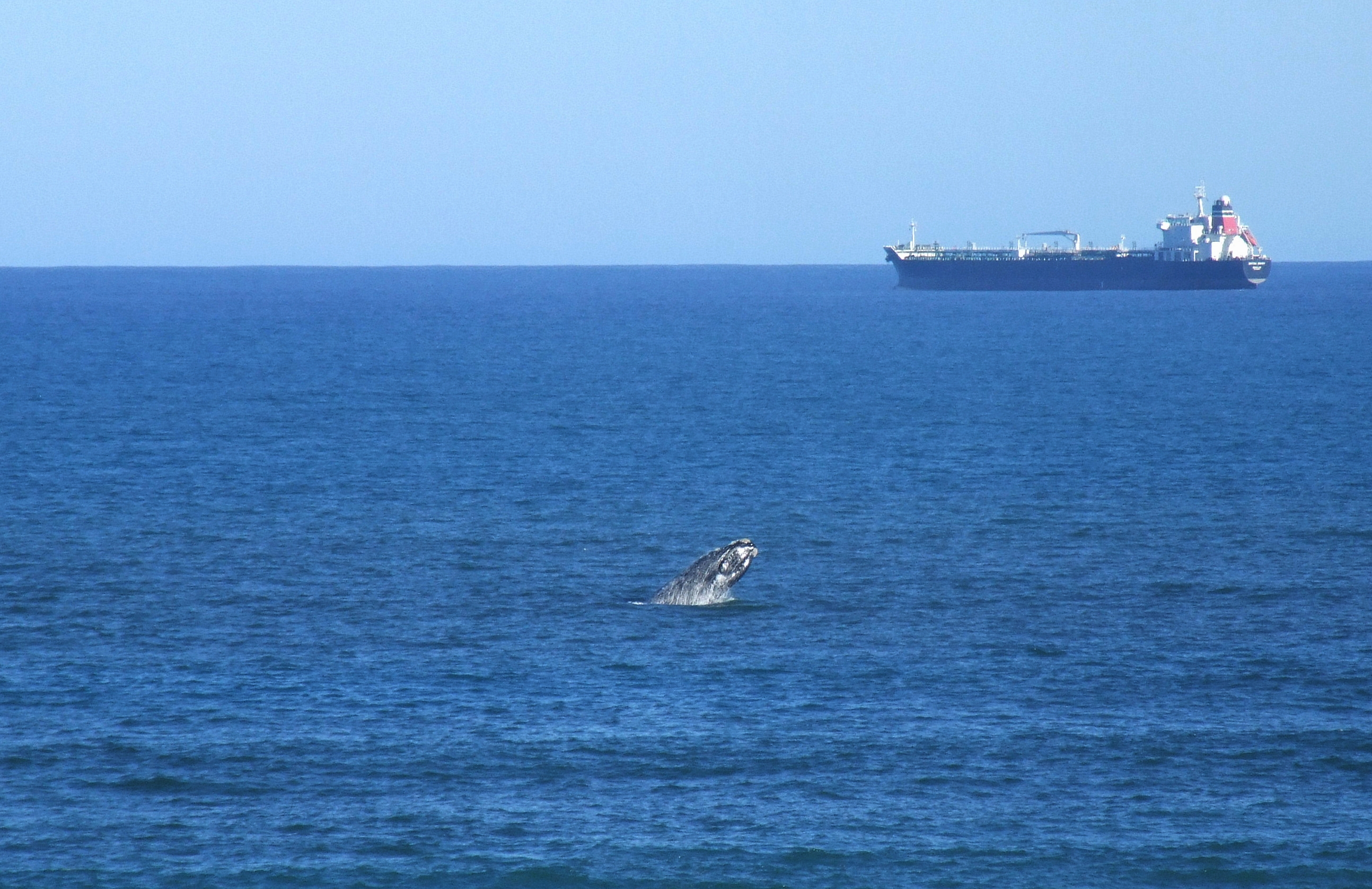
Whale breaching off George, Western Cape with a tanker behind

The southern right whale has made Hermanus, South Africa, one of the world centres for whale watching. During the winter months (June to October), southern right whales come so close to the shoreline that visitors can watch them from the shore as well as from strategically placed hotels. The town employs a "whale crier" (cf. town crier) to walk through the town announcing where whales have been seen. Hermanus also has two boat–based whale watching operators. Southern right whales can also be watched at False Bay from the shore or from the boats of operators in Simon's Town. Plettenberg Bay along the Garden Route of South Africa is also known for whale watching including both land and boat based watching, not only for southern rights (July to December) but throughout the year. Southern right whales can also be seen off the coast of Port Elizabeth with marine eco tours running from the Port Elizabeth harbour, as some southern right whales make Algoa Bay their home for the winter months.

Although southern right whales have been seen in neighboring countries including Namibia, Mozambique, and Madagascar, they are not the targeted species for whale watching tours in these countries.

=== South America ===
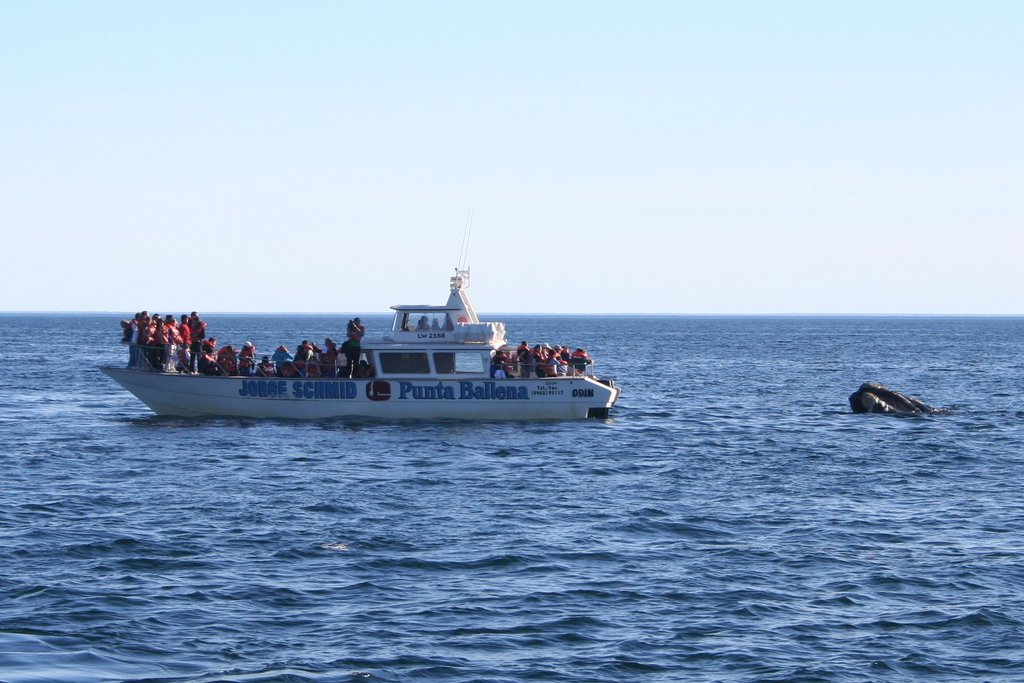
Southern right whale approaches close to whale watchers near Península Valdés in Patagonia

In Brazil, Imbituba in Santa Catarina has been recognised as the National Right Whale Capital and holds annual Right Whale Week celebrations in September, when mothers and calves are more often seen. The old whaling station there is now a museum that documents the history of right whales in Brazil. In Argentina, Península Valdés in Patagonia hosts (in winter) the largest breeding population, with more than 2,000 catalogued by the Whale Conservation Institute and Ocean Alliance. As in the south of Argentina, the whales come within 200 m (660 ft) of the main beach in the city of Puerto Madryn and form a part of the large ecotourism industry. Uruguay's Parliament on 4 September 2013, has become the first country in the world to make all of its territorial waters a haven for whales and dolphins. Every year, dozens of whales are sighted, especially in the departments of Maldonado and Rocha during winter. Swimming activities for commercial objectives had been banned in the area in 1985, but were legalised in Gulf of San Matías, the only place in the world where humans are formally allowed to swim with the species. Land-based watching and occasional kayaking with whales activities are seen at other locations not renowned for whale-watching as much as Puerto Madryn and with less restrictions on approaching whales, such as at Puerto Deseado, Mar del Plata, and Miramar in Buenos Aires.

Though their numbers are dangerously small, land-based sightings of whales are on the increase in recent years off Chile and Peru, with some hope of creating new tourism industries, especially in the Strait of Magellan, most notably around Cape Virgenes.

=== Oceania ===
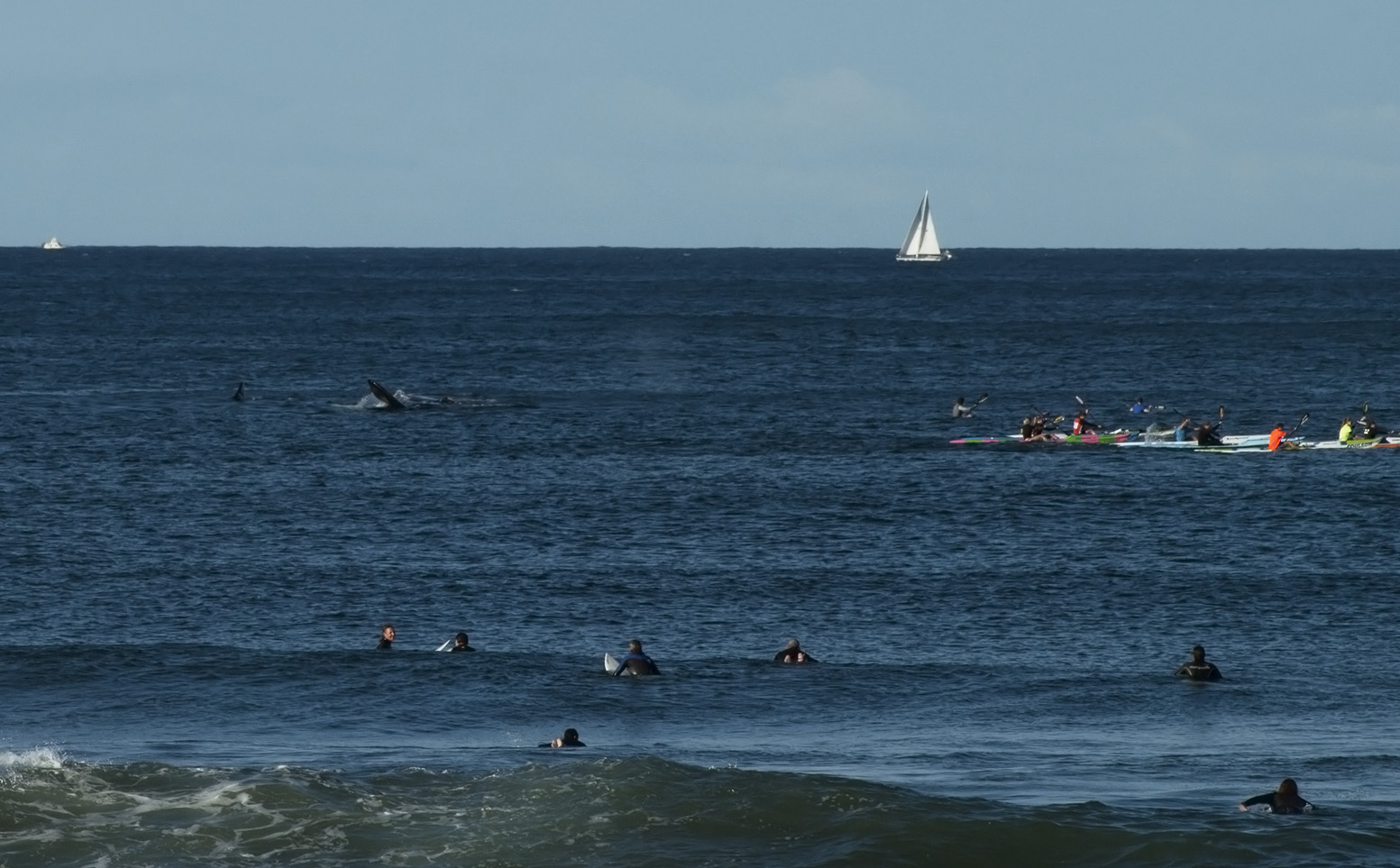
Whales cavort next to surfers on Manly Beach.

In Australia's winter and spring, southern right whales can be seen migrating along the Great Australian Bight in South Australia. Viewing locations include the Bunda Cliffs and Twin Rocks, the Head of the Bight (where a visitor centre and cliff-top viewing boardwalks exist) and at Fowler's Bay where accommodation and charter boat tours are offered. Another popular South Australian locality for Southern right whale watching is Encounter Bay, where the South Australian Whale Centre supports local whale-watchers and tourists. In Warrnambool, Victoria, a right whale nursery is also a popular tourist attraction. The whales' migratory range is extending as the species continues to recover and re-colonize other areas of the continent, including the coastal waters of New South Wales and Tasmania. In Tasmania, the first birth since the 19th century was recorded in 2010 in the River Derwent.

Similarly, southern right whales may provide chances for the public to observe whales from shore on New Zealand's coasts with greater regularity than in the past, especially in southern Fiordland, Southland through to the Otago coast, and on the North Island coast, especially in Northland and other locations such as the Bay of Plenty and the South Taranaki Bight. Births of calves could have always been occurring on the main islands' coasts, but were confirmed with two cow-calf pairs in 2012.

=== Subantarctic ===
In the Subantarctic Islands and in the vicinity of Antarctica, where few regulations exist or are enforced, whales can be observed on expedition tours with increasing probability. The Auckland Islands are a specially designated sanctuary for right whales, where whale-watching tourism is prohibited without authorisation.

== Popular culture ==
The species was featured on a 70p commemorative stamp issued by Tristan da Cunha in 2019 as part of a set celebrating different species of whale.

== See also ==
- List of cetaceans
- List of marine mammal species
