= Tail sailing =

Behaviour of certain whales

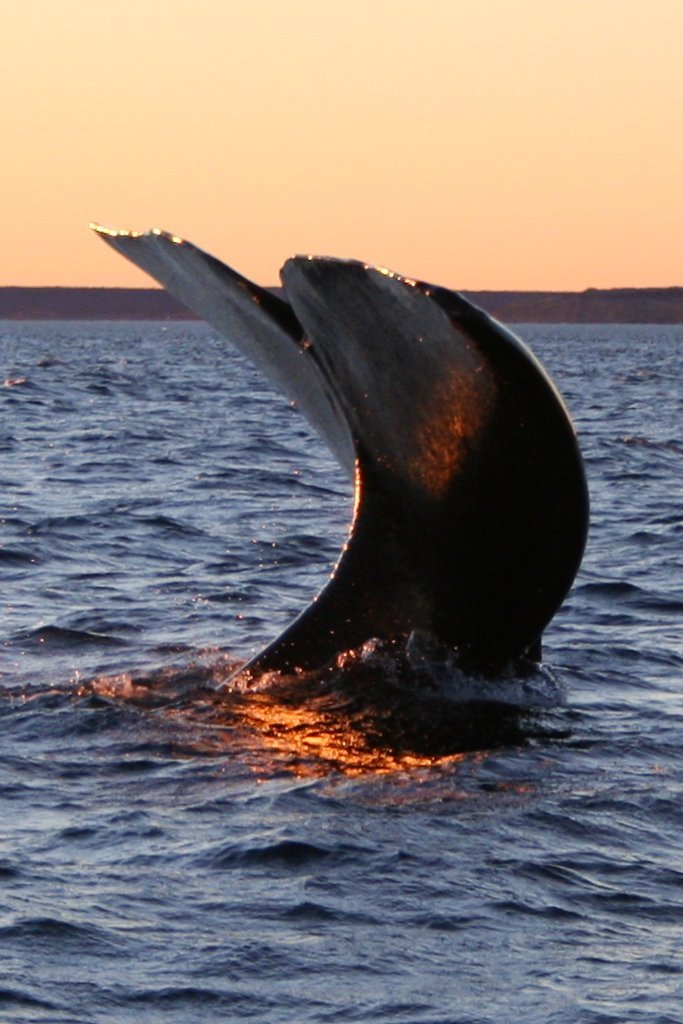
"Sailing" by a southern right whale.

Hawaiian Islands Humpback Whale National Marine Sanctuary footage of the tail sailing behaviour of a humpback whale.

Tail sailing refers to the action of whales lifting their tails clear of the water for long periods of time. The process is rarely observed by humans, and the precise motivation for this phenomenon is unknown. It is thought that whales either undertake this activity to catch the wind and 'sail' through the water, or as a method to cool down. A third theory suggests that the whale is feeding close to the sea floor.

Scientists believe that tail-sailing is fairly common amongst certain species, such as the southern right whale.
