= Caleta Zorra =

- Location within Chile
- Location: Chile
- Coordinates: 43.133333°S 74.316667°W
- Type: Bay

Caleta Zorra (meaning "Bay of foxes" in Spanish) is an enclosed, half-moon shaped inlet on the Pacific coast of Chiloé Island in Los Lagos region, southern Chile. Lying north of Punta Pabellion, it is located among Punta Zorra and Punta Barranco. The nearest residential area is the township of Puerto Carmen.

== Environment ==
Areas surrounding the cove are rich natural environments. Whales such as blue whales and fin whale swim just off the bay. Possibly, migrating coastal whales such as southern right whales and humpback whales occasionally appear and rest in the sheltered bay.

== See also ==
- Chiloé National Park
- Alfaguara project
