= Pacific Whale Foundation =

US-based non-profit organization

- Abbreviation: PWF
- Formation: 1980; 46 years ago
- Type: Nonprofit
- Tax ID no.: 99-0207417
- Legal status: 501(c)(3) Foundation
- Purpose: Conservation
- Headquarters: Maui, Hawaii, United States
- Board Chair: Mary Kate Rosack
- Interim Executive Director: Dayna Garland
- Website: www.pacificwhale.org

The Pacific Whale Foundation (PWF) is a non-profit, non-governmental organization founded in 1980 and based in Maui, Hawaii, that conducts whale research and educates the public in an effort to save vulnerable species of whales from extinction. As of 2012 the organization had about 150 employees.

Its main goal is to save and protect vulnerable species of whales and dolphins from extinction. Since its foundation the PWF has been working to prevent destruction of populations of humpback whales, dolphins, turtles and coral reefs in Hawaii. They accomplish this by conducting whale research and educating the public.

The PWF also has a second home in Hervey Bay, Queensland, Australia.

PacWhale Eco-Adventure

The PacWhale Eco-Adventure is a touring operation that is completely owned by the PWF. Certified Marine Naturalists lead whale watching trips to the public. These trips are meant to share the PWF’s findings, educate the public on whales and to generate funds to further research conservation and work.

Annual Maui Whale Festival

Every year since its discovery, the PWF holds the Annual Maui Whale Festival with events occurring throughout the month of February to celebrate the return of the humpback whales to Maui Nui. Some of these annual events include the World Whale Film Festival, World Whale Day Parade, and the Walk/Run for Whales Marathon where all proceeds go to whale conservation. During this time the PWF also organizes a “Great Whale Count” where volunteers systemically gather data on whales that can be seen from ten observation points along the southern shore of Maui, giving a series of snapshots that indicate changes in whales populations.

Projects Funded

The Pacific Whale Foundation provided funding to the Alfaguara project on Isla de Chiloé in southern Chile for marine surveys of the local blue whale population in the 2012 season.
