= Alfaguara project =

Blue whale conservation project in Southern Chile

Alfaguara
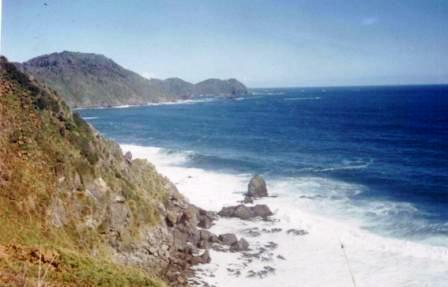
- Anay Rocks on the west coast of Chiloé Island

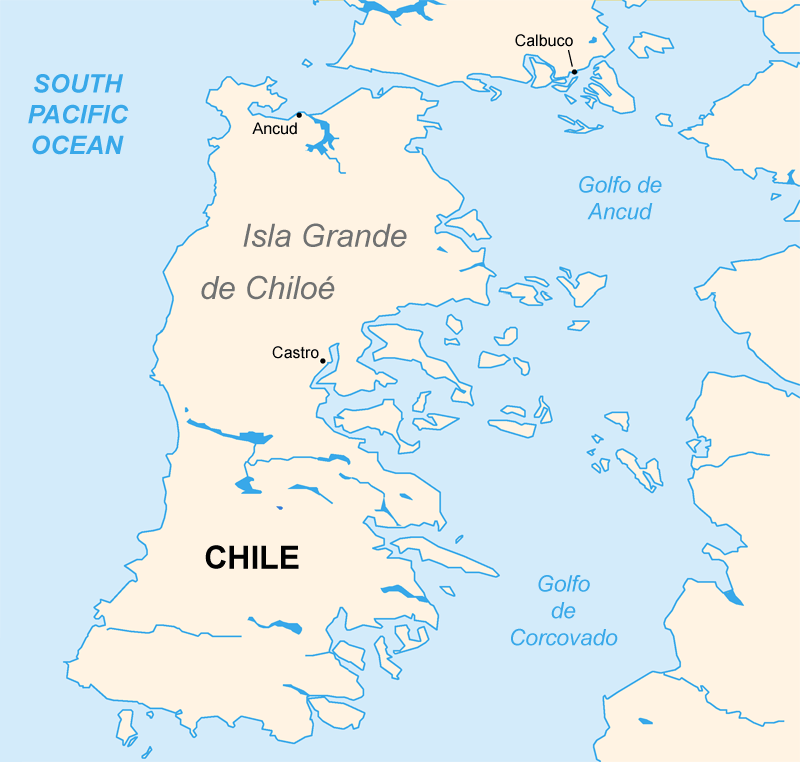
- Location: Chile, Pacific Ocean
- Coordinates: 42.376807°S 74.53949°W
- Established: 2008
- Website: www.ccc-chile.org

The Alfaguara project is a marine life conservation project operated from Puñihuil in the northwest of Chiloé Island, the main island in the Chiloé Archipelago in southern Chile.

"Alfaguara" was the name given to blue whales by Chilean whalers. The focus of the project is on preservation of these endangered animals, the largest in the world. The project is operated by the Centro de Conservacion Cetacea (CCC), established in 2001. Its studies have made the Chiloé blue whale population one of the best understood in the southern hemisphere.

== Organization ==
The Alfaguara Project was launched in 2004 and combines a long-term program of scientific research with local education and community building. It looks for ways to use whales in Chilean waters and preserve the marine ecosystem that do not involve killing the whales. It is recognized as a marine conservation initiative of national interest. In 2008 the government of Chile agreed with the Alfaguara Project's request to establish a whale sanctuary following a poll in which 98% of citizens voted in favor.

The project depends on the informed participation of the northwest coastal community of Chiloé and also involves national authorities and international experts. It is sponsored by the General Directorate of Maritime Territory and Merchant Marine and the Ministry of Foreign Affairs. It has been assisted by the Rufford Maurice Laing Foundation, Global Ocean and the Mohamed bin Zayed Species Conservation Fund. The Pacific Whale Foundation provided funding for the 2012 season.

== Conservation issues ==
The part of the Chilean Sea immediately northwest of Chiloé is an important long-term feeding area for blue whales. In the period between 1926 and 1967 whaling ships slaughtered about 97% of the blue whales in the southern Pacific. The relatively small and isolated population remaining near the Chiloé is threatened by the risk of collision from increasing volumes of shipping, noise and pollution from a Norwegian salmon farming operation and possibly from rising ocean temperatures leading to changes in the food species available to the whales.

A 2007 survey showed that many of the whales feeding in the area were thin and/or had skin lesions. Causes of the skin lesions include cookiecutter shark bites and skin disease, thought to be caused by types of calicivirus and poxvirus. Both families of virus are associated with a degraded marine environment.

== Conservation activities ==
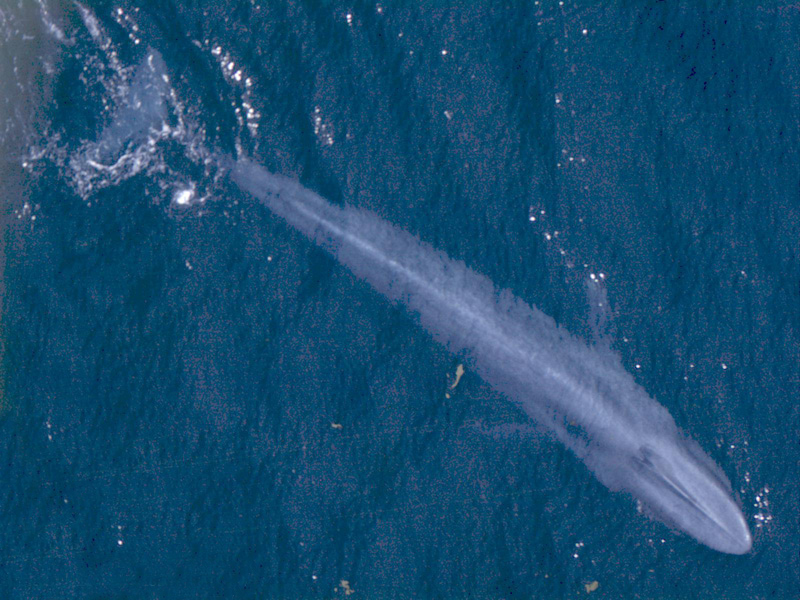
Blue whale

Investigators have been identifying individual whales through examination of photographs that show the patterns on their flanks. In the 2007 season the project made 17 marine surveys, photo-identifying 188 individuals. The researchers also collected samples of faeces and zooplankton, made sound recordings, measured environmental parameters and collected data about individual behavior. The 2007 surveys also recording humpback whales and Risso's dolphins. Data was supplemented by land-based observations and aerial surveys. As of 2012 the team had identified 363 individuals, with almost one third seen more than once in the period between 2009 and 2011. The detailed information will provide deeper understanding of the whales' habits and how they are affected by changes to their environment, including acoustic issues. Other species such as fin whales, sei whales, and southern minke whales are also confirmed in the area. Possibly, the region is functioning as the most important forging area for critically endangered southern right whales that face near extinction in the nation.

== Ecotourism ==
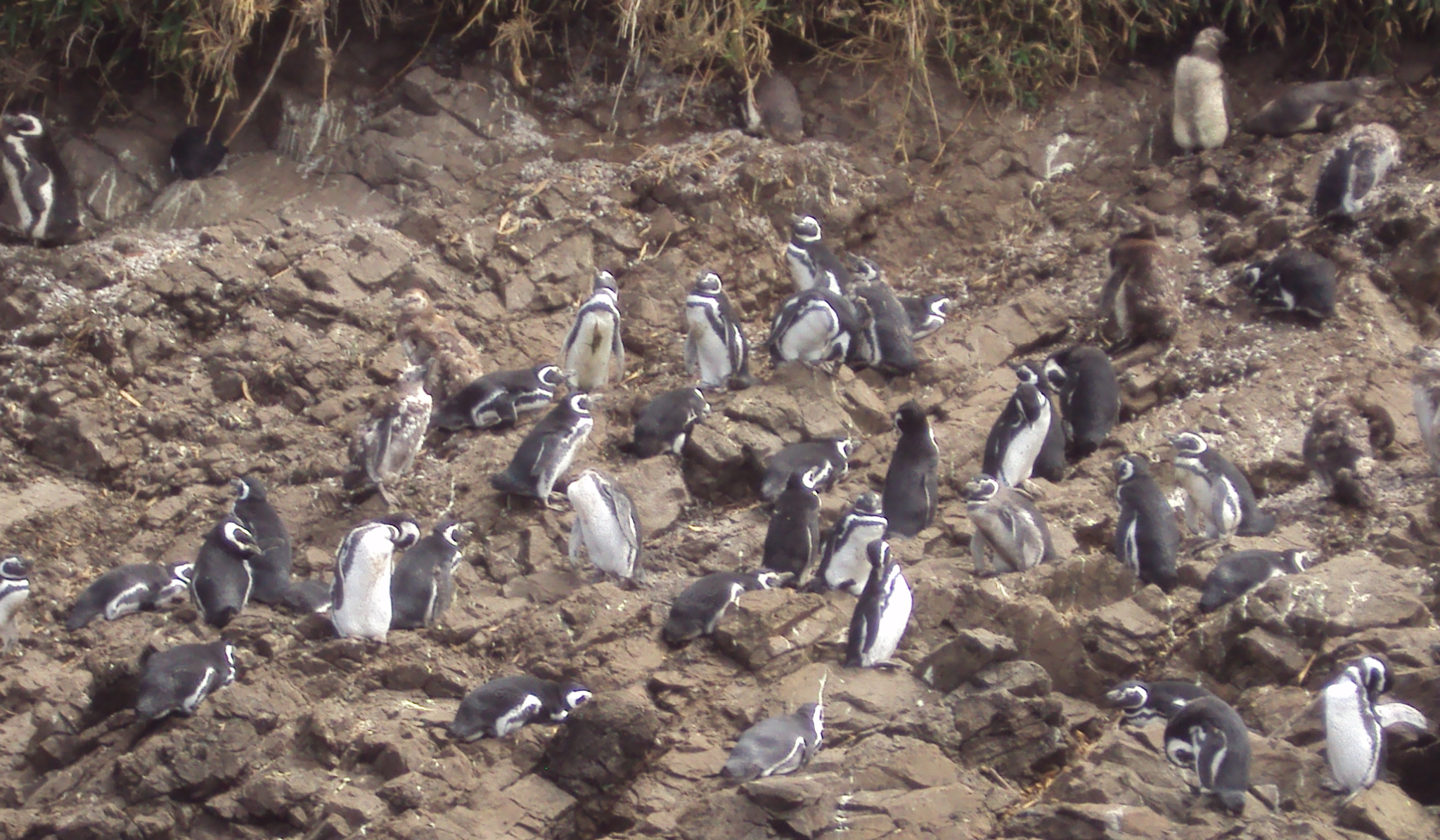
Penguins on the Islote 1 Puñihuil

The coastal community has been involved in whale spotting and in developing responsible marine ecotourism, thus contributing to the conservation program while benefiting from it economically. Whales may be sighted from the shore. Boat-based whale watching is limited by the weather conditions and type of vessel required to perhaps 1,000 visitors annually, but should be economically viable. There is additional revenue potential from providing food and lodging to ecotourists, sale of souvenirs, trekking and horse-riding and other activities. Other areas such as around Caleta Zorra are also suitable for whale watching activities.

Chiloé is home to the main colony of sea lions in Chile. Three islands about 300 metres (980 ft) off the Puñihuil beach are important breeding sites for Magellanic and Humboldt penguins in the summer months between September and March. The islands are also breeding grounds for sooty shearwater and are home to endangered marine otters. In 1999 they were designated the Islotes de Puñihuil Natural Monument. Following a study by the Alfaguara Project the ecotourism boat operators agreed to work together as an association, reducing the number of penguin-watching trips to the islands so as to maximize net income.

== See also ==
- Cetacean Conservation Center
- Corcovado National Park (Chile)
- Chiloé National Park
