= Islotes de Puñihuil Natural Monument =

- IUCN category III (natural monument or feature)
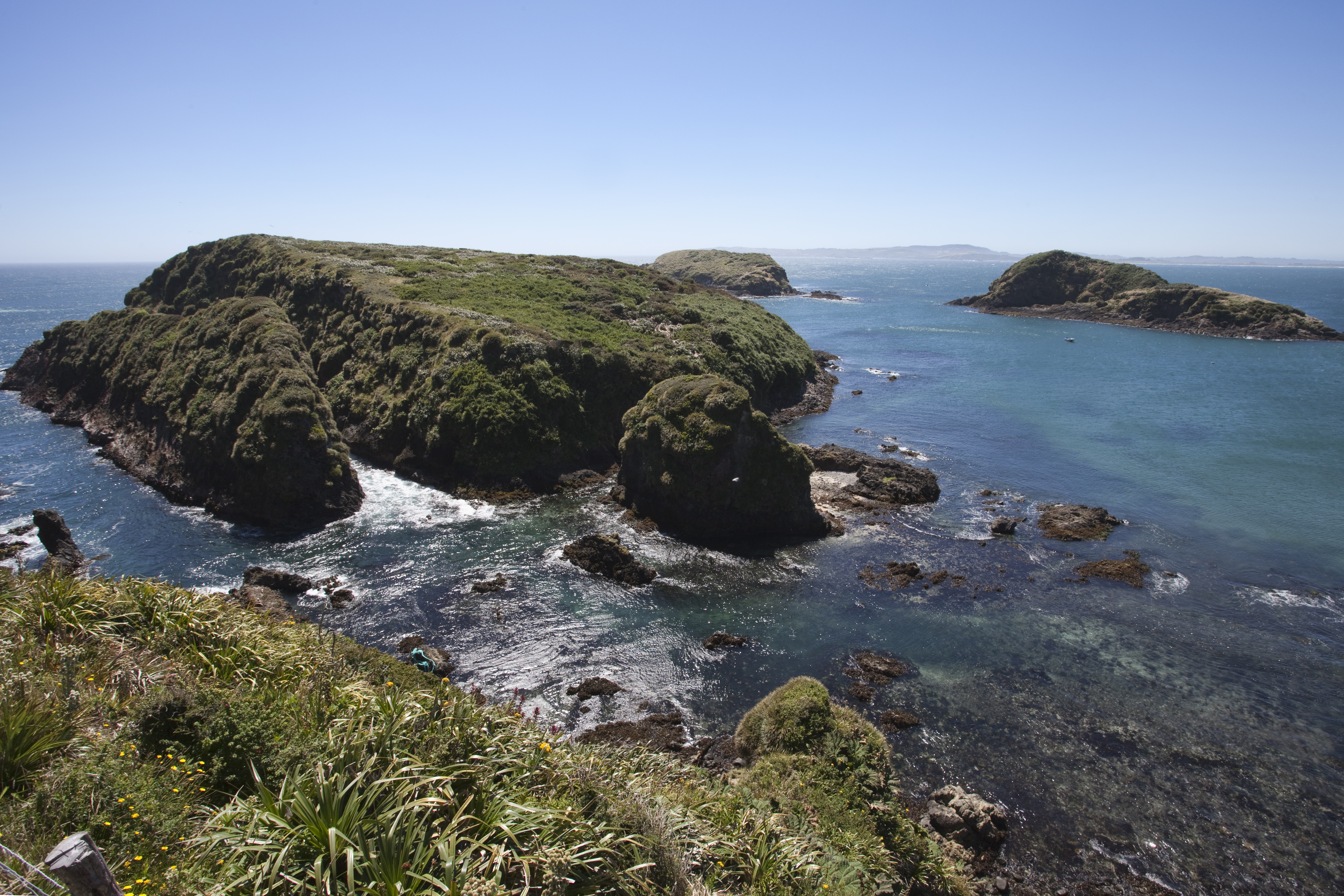
- Interactive map of Islotes de Puñihuil Natural Monument
- Location: Los Lagos Region, Chile
- Coordinates: 41°55′29″S 74°02′21″W
- Area: 0.0864 km^{2} (0.0334 sq mi)
- Established: 1999
- Governing body: Corporación Nacional Forestal

Islotes de Puñihuil Natural Monument is a Chilean Natural Monument located 28 km (17 mi) southwest of Ancud. It consists of three islets off the western coast of Chiloé Island to the west and north of Puñihuil.

The monument is notable for being the only known shared breeding site for Humboldt and Magellanic penguins. It is also a breeding area for other species, such as the red-legged cormorant and kelp gull. Other bird species residing in the area include the kelp goose and Fuegian steamer duck. Marine otters also find refuge in this protected area.

Following a 2007 study by the staff from Alfaguara project, which works on conserving blue whales and the marine environment in the area, ecotourism boat operators agreed to work together as an association. They would reduce the number of penguin-watching trips to the islands so as to maximize net income.

Plant species occurring in the islets include Fascicularia bicolor and Greigia sphacelata.
