= Cetacean Conservation Center =

Chilean non-governmental organization

The Cetacean Conservation Center (Centro de Conservación Cetacea or CCC) is a Chilean NGO dedicated to the conservation of cetaceans and other marine mammals that inhabit the coastal waters of Chile. The CCC also engages in public education and information campaigns at the national and regional level.

== Mission ==
Centro de Conservación Cetacea (CCC) is a Chilean non-governmental and non-profit organization that actively and effectively works on the conservation of marine mammals and their aquatic ecosystems in Chilean waters. The goals in support of this mission are:

1. Promote effective [marine conservation] and management policies.
2. Conduct management and conservation related research on cetacean species and their ecosystems, with special focus on studying endangered species.
3. Identify and assess anthropogenic impacts on marine [wildlife] and propose mitigation measures.
4. Promote the sustainable development of coastal communities through responsible marine wildlife watching activities.
5. Increase public awareness and promote the informed and active participation of people/government on marine biodiversity conservation as well as encourage the reduction of human impacts.
6. Strengthen national and international cooperation in marine conservation strategies

== History ==
Since 2001, Centro de Conservacion Cetacea has conducted national marine conservation projects, including a wide range of areas like scientific research, public education, coastal community development and strengthening of marine conservation policies:

"CITES CHILE 2002, Our Opportunity to Protect Life", that reached over 140 thousand people of all the country with an educational exhibit of life size inflatable whales and sharks. As a result, the government of Chile strongly opposed proposals oriented to down list whale species from Appendix I and supported proposals oriented to include whale and basking sharks in CITES Appendix II, during the 12th Conference of the Parties of CITES conducted in Santiago de Chile.

"Southern Right Whale Project/Chile", a project that has been conducted since 2003 with the official support of the Chilean Navy and the cooperation of leading right whale conservation organizations from Argentina, Brazil and Uruguay. In 2008 the southeast Pacific population of this species was classified as critically endangered by the International Union for Conservation of Nature (IUCN) and the Chilean Navy granted maximum level of protection to the species.

"National Marine Mammal Sighting Network", it has work effectively thanks to the support and cooperation of the Chilean Navy and more than 500 members that actively participate in recording of cetacean sightings and stranding events along the Chilean coast.

Alfaguara project. It has consolidated as a scientific and coastal sustainable development project of national interest by receiving the official support of the Chilean Navy, the Ministry of Foreign Affairs and the Ministry of Education of Chile. The project has also identified the area with the highest sighting rate of blue whales in the Southern Hemisphere (northwestern Chiloé Island) and has raised international awareness regarding the health status of this blue whale population by describing skinny blue whales and skin lesions associated to coastal pollution from the salmon farming industry.

"Chile 2008, A Whale Sanctuary", that was conducted during eight months in conjunction with Centro Ecoceanos and the National Confederation of Artisan Fishers of Chile. As a result, the sanctuary was achieved in only eight months with the unanimous support by the Chilean Congress of the bill/law that bans all types of whaling operations in Chilean jurisdictional waters (EEZ) and sets the basis for consolidating a national marine conservation policy. This is the first marine protection policy adopted in Chilean history and the most important measure taken until date in the country for the effective conservation of cetacean species and their marine environment.

== See also ==
- Alfaguara project
