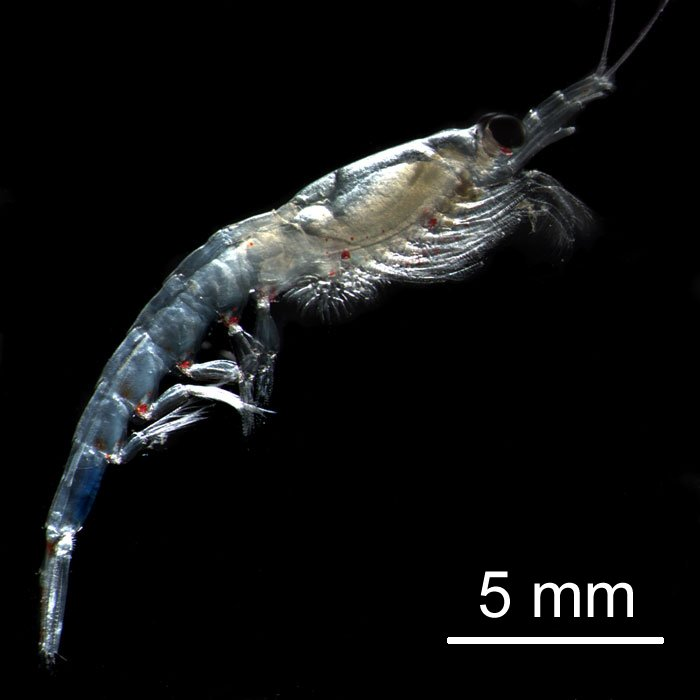
- Thysanoessa raschii

Scientific classification
- Kingdom: Animalia
- Phylum: Arthropoda
- Class: Malacostraca
- Order: Euphausiacea
- Family: Euphausiidae
- Genus: Thysanoessa; Brandt, 1851

Type species
- Thysanoessa raschii Michael Sars, 1864

= Thysanoessa =

Genus of krill

Thysanoessa is a genus of the krill that play critical roles in the marine food web. They're abundant in Arctic and Antarctic areas, feeding on zooplankton and detritus to obtain energy. Thysanoessa are responsible for the transportation of carbon and nutrients from surface waters to deeper trophic levels. This genus serves as prey for various fish and provide energy to marine ecosystems as they are at a low trophic level. Most travel through vertical migration, meaning they travel up and down in the water column, providing food for predators at the surface during the night, and at deeper levels during the day.

== Growth & development ==
Longevity in this genus varies depending on the specie. The average lifespan for the Thysanoessa is between three and four years. The development and growth of this organism takes place during winter to autumn. Thysanoessa are broadcast spawners, meaning that the males will physically put their sperm onto the female's body so that the eggs become fertilized as the female releases them. Once released and in the water, the eggs are dispersed and on their own, ready to hatch in the nauplius stage. Female krill lay over 10,000 eggs, sometimes seasonally, resulting in large populations. The Thysanoessa larvae are slender and their carapace is short in early stages. As the body expands, the cephalothorax becomes transparent.

== Anatomy ==
Thysanoessa are decapod crustaceans, meaning that they have five pairs of legs on their three-parted body. The cephalothorax is divided into the head, the thorax, and the pleon. With the help of the legs and two antennae, the krill is able to feed and groom freely. The male species have a "rounded lobe" on the first and second antennae called a setae. The Thysanoessa genus is a bioluminescent organism. They have organs called photophores that undergo an enzymatic chemical reaction. These bioluminescent enzymes derive from the consumption of dinoflagellates, yet the complete role of photophores are still unknown.

== Feeding ==
At low food concentrations, Thysanoessa has higher feeding rates compared to other krill. Studies have shown that high feeding rates are due to morphology of appendage and stomach content. Thysanoessa have a high content of fatty acid that comes from the consumption of copepods which contain wax-ester. This genus also feeds on decaying plant material from suspended water columns and bottom sediments. The spacing in the appendage of a Thysanoessa allows for different sources of food between species, Many species of Thysanoessa, for instance, T. inermis and T. raschii differentiate in food sources during the winter and spring.

== Habitat ==
Thysanoessa are found in the Western and Central Barents Sea. Their location varies within species, while some are boreal, others live in a sub-arctic habitat. Shifts in locations are caused by impacts of global warming and severe changes in ocean temperatures. Given this, Arctic habitats are projected to shift vigorously in the next years, impacting krill growth and abundance of nutrients such as chlorophyll a. The movement of krill in various geographic locations result in a movement of energy in the food web. Carbon, caloric, and lipid concentrations vary depending on the specie and the location. Over time, Thysanoessa have been able to adapt to different temperatures in different regions, making their corporal composition change gradually.

== Species ==
Thysanoessa is a genus of krill, containing the following species:

- Thysanoessa gregaria G. O. Sars, 1885
- Thysanoessa inermis (Krøyer, 1846)

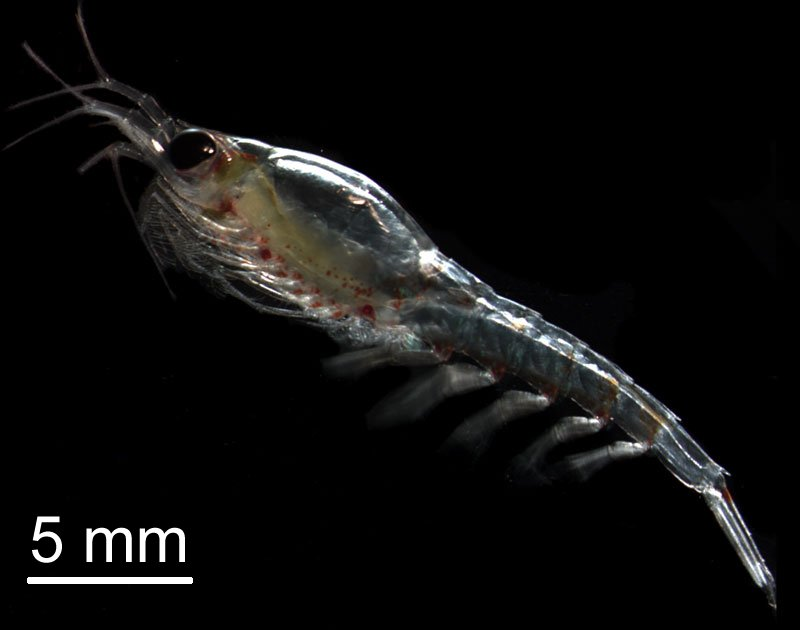
T. inermis

- Thysanoessa inspinata Nemoto, 1963
- Thysanoessa longicaudata (Krøyer, 1846)
- Thysanoessa longipes Brandt, 1851

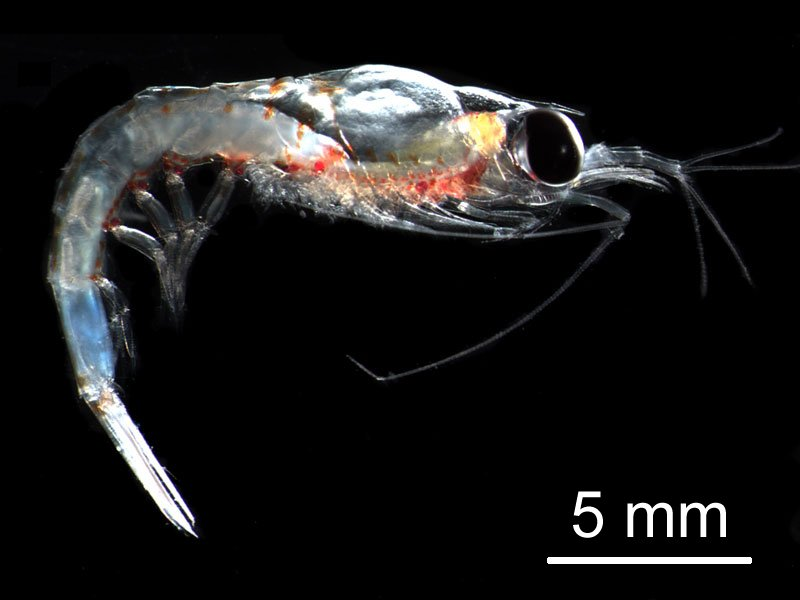
T. longipes

- Thysanoessa macrura G. O. Sars, 1885
- Thysanoessa parva Hansen, 1905
- Thysanoessa raschii (M. Sars, 1864)
- Thysanoessa spinifera Holmes, 1900
- Thysanoessa vicina Hansen, 1911
