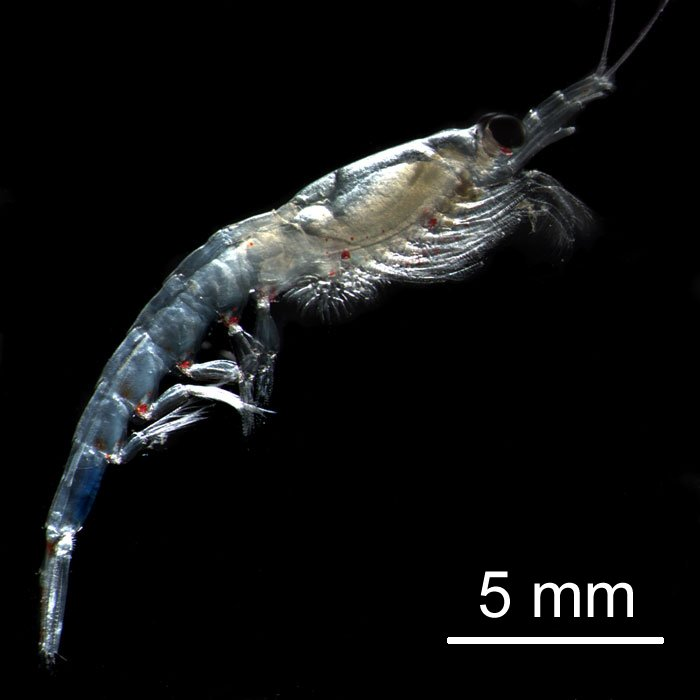

Scientific classification
- Kingdom: Animalia
- Phylum: Arthropoda
- Class: Malacostraca
- Order: Euphausiacea
- Family: Euphausiidae
- Genus: Thysanoessa
- Species: T. raschii

Binomial name
- Thysanoessa raschii M. Sars, 1864

Synonyms
- Rhoda jardineana Sim, 1872; Euphausia raschii G. O. Sars, 1883; Boreophausia raschii Norman, 1886; Rhoda raschii Stebbing, 1893

= Thysanoessa raschii =

Species of krill

Thysanoessa raschii, sometimes known as Arctic krill, is one of the most common euphausiid species of the subarctic and Arctic seas. They may reach 20–25 millimetres (0.8–1.0 in) long, and are sexually mature above 14 mm (0.6 in).

T. raschii is a major prey item of several taxa, planktivorous fishes and marine mammals. It is also a common prey item of seabirds, including shearwaters.

This species goes through a number of stages in its development. Roderick Macdonald defined the characteristics of fourteen stages, or 'furcilia'.
