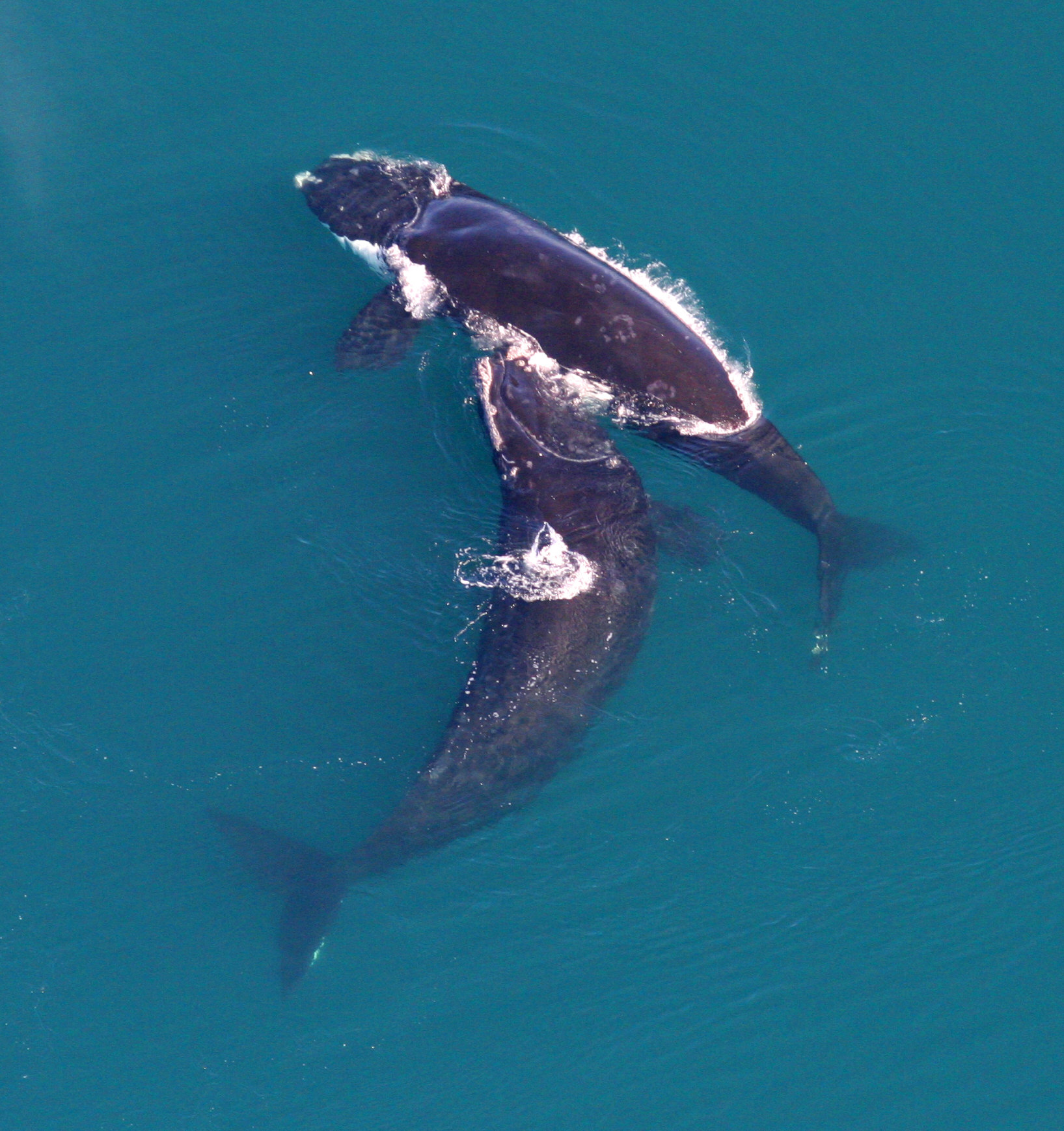

- Size compared to an average human

Conservation status
- Critically Endangered (IUCN 3.1)

- Critically Imperiled (NatureServe)
- CITES Appendix I

Scientific classification
- Kingdom: Animalia
- Phylum: Chordata
- Class: Mammalia
- Order: Artiodactyla
- Infraorder: Cetacea
- Family: Balaenidae
- Genus: Eubalaena
- Species: E. glacialis

Binomial name
- Eubalaena glacialis (Müller, 1776)
- Range map

Synonyms
- List: Balaena biscayensis Eschricht, 1860; B. glacialis Müller, 1776; B. glacialis glacialis Scheffer & Rice, 1963; B. mysticetus islandica Kerr, 1792; B. nordcaper Lacépède, 1804; Baloena glacialis Robineau, 1989; E. glacialis glacialis Tomilin, 1957; Hunterius swedenborgii Lilljeborg, 1867; Macleayius britannicus Gray, 1870

= North Atlantic right whale =

Species of whale found in the North Atlantic Ocean

The North Atlantic right whale (Eubalaena glacialis) is a baleen whale, one of three right whale species belonging to the genus Eubalaena, all of which were formerly classified as a single species. Because of their docile nature, their slow surface-skimming feeding behaviors, their tendencies to stay close to the coast, and their high blubber content (which makes them float when they are killed, and which produces high yields of whale oil), right whales were once a preferred target for whalers. At present, they are among the most endangered whales in the world, and they are protected under the U.S. Endangered Species Act and Marine Mammal Protection Act and Canada's Species at Risk Act. As of 2026, there are an estimated 380 individuals, including 70 breeding females. They migrate between feeding grounds in the Labrador Sea and their winter calving areas off Georgia and Florida, an ocean area with heavy shipping traffic. In the eastern North Atlantic, on the other hand—with a total population reaching into the low teens at most—scientists believe that they may become functionally extinct in the next two decades. Vessel strikes and entanglement in fixed fishing gear, which together account for nearly half of all North Atlantic right whale mortality since 1970, are their two greatest threats to recovery.

== Description ==
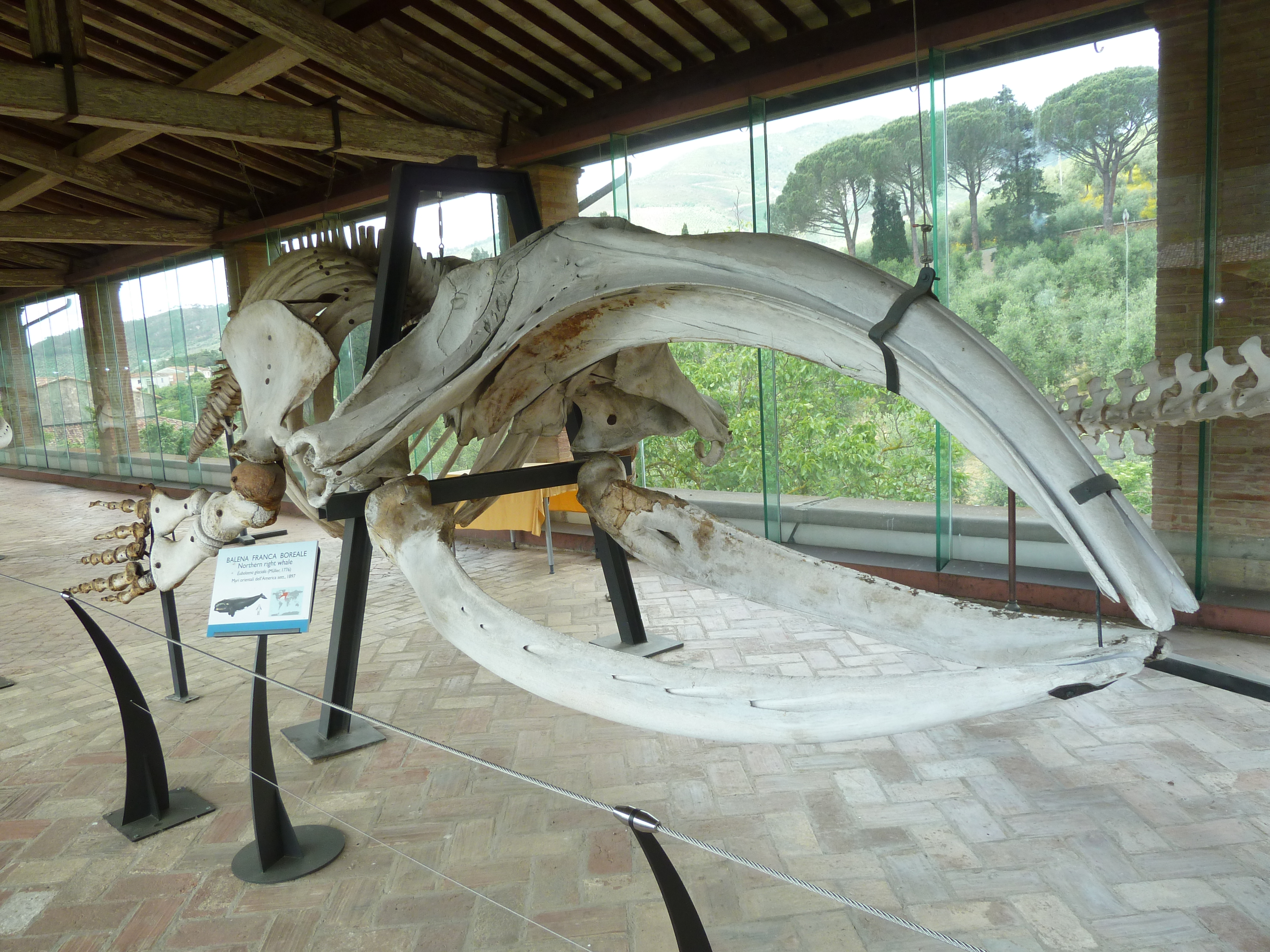
Skeleton specimen exhibited in the Pisa Museum of Natural History

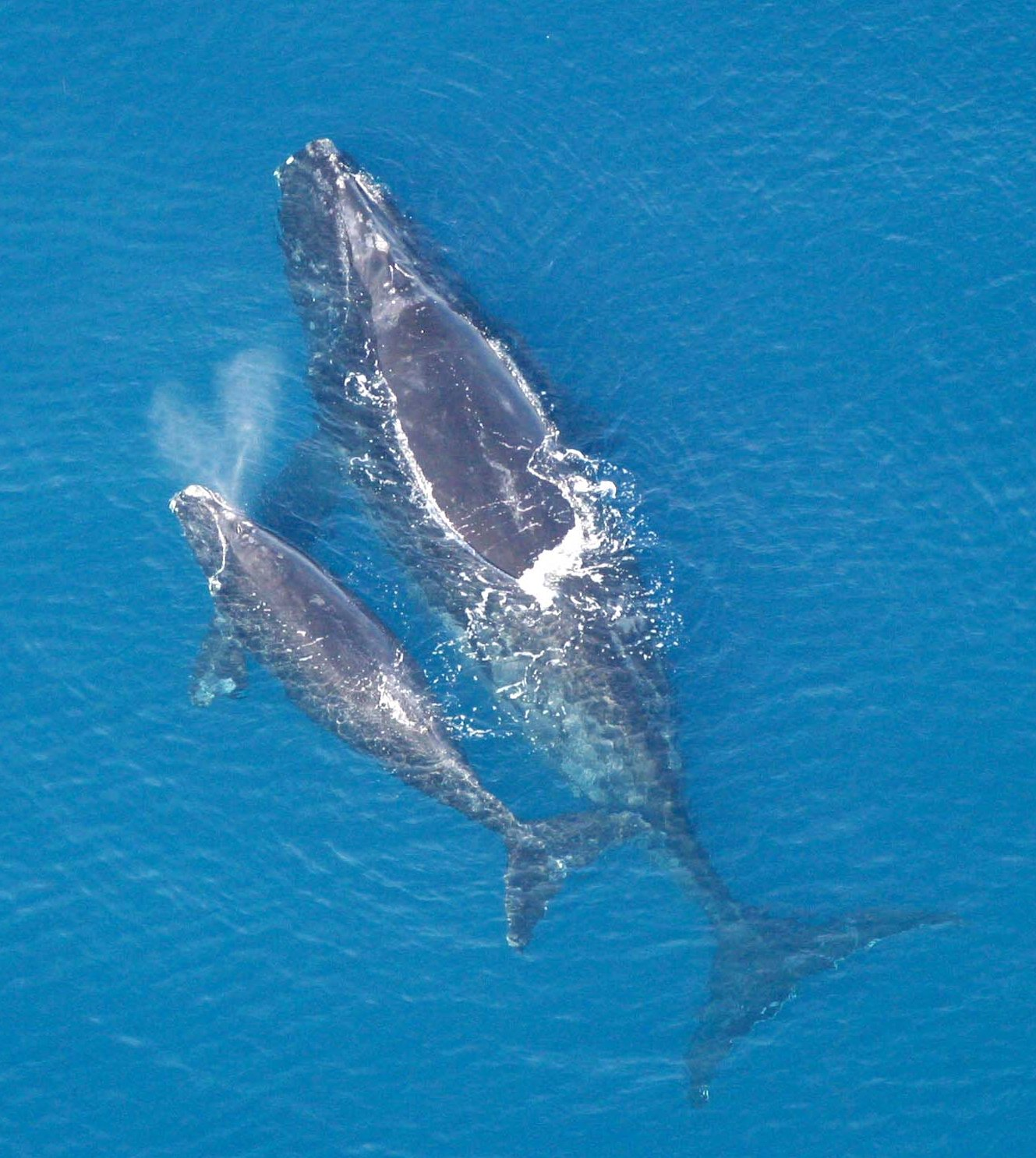
Cow and calf.

Like other right whales, the North Atlantic right whale, also known as the northern right whale or black right whale, is readily distinguished from other cetaceans by the absence of a dorsal fin on its broad back, short, paddle-like pectoral flippers and a long arching mouth that begins above the eye. Its coloration is dark grey to black, with some individuals occasionally having white patches on their stomachs or throats. Other unique features include a large head, which makes up a quarter of its total body length, narrow tail stock in comparison to its wide fluke, and v-shaped blowhole which produces a heart-shaped blow.

The most distinguishing feature for right whales is their callosities: rough, white patches of keratinized skin found on their heads. The right whale's callosities provide habitat for large colonies of cyamids or whale lice, which feed on the right whale's skin as these small crustaceans cannot survive in open water. The relationship between cyamids and right whales is symbiotic in nature but is poorly understood by scientists. Callosities are not caused by the external environment and are present on fetuses before birth. However, Cyamids near the blowhole have been linked to chronic entanglement and other injuries; their presence in this area has been used as measure of individual health in visual health assessments.

Adult North Atlantic right whales average 13–18 m (43–59 ft) in length and weigh approximately 40,000 to 90,000 kg (44 to 99 short tons), they are slightly smaller on average than the North Pacific species. On each side of the upper jaw are 200–270 baleen plates. These are narrow and approximately 3 m (9.8 ft) long, and are covered in very thin hairs. The pectoral fin is 1.7 m (5.6 ft) long. The largest measured specimens have been 18.5 m (61 ft) long and 106,000–108,000 kg (234,000–238,000 lb). Females are larger than males.

Up to forty-five percent of a right whale's body weight is blubber. This high percentage causes their body to float after death due to the fact that blubber has a low density.

There is little data on their lifespan but it is believed to be at least 70 years, although individuals in species closely related to right whales have been found to live more than 100 years. Currently, female North Atlantic Right whales live on average 45 years and males 65 years. Age of right whales can be determined by examining their earwax postmortem. The oldest recorded whale was sighted between March 24, 1935 and August 13, 1995, and is thought to have been as old as 70 years. However, a 2024 study found that the average lifespan was only 22 years, with only 10% of individuals living longer than 47 years, presumably as a result of shortened lifespans due to commercial whaling.

== Behavior ==
=== Surface activities ===
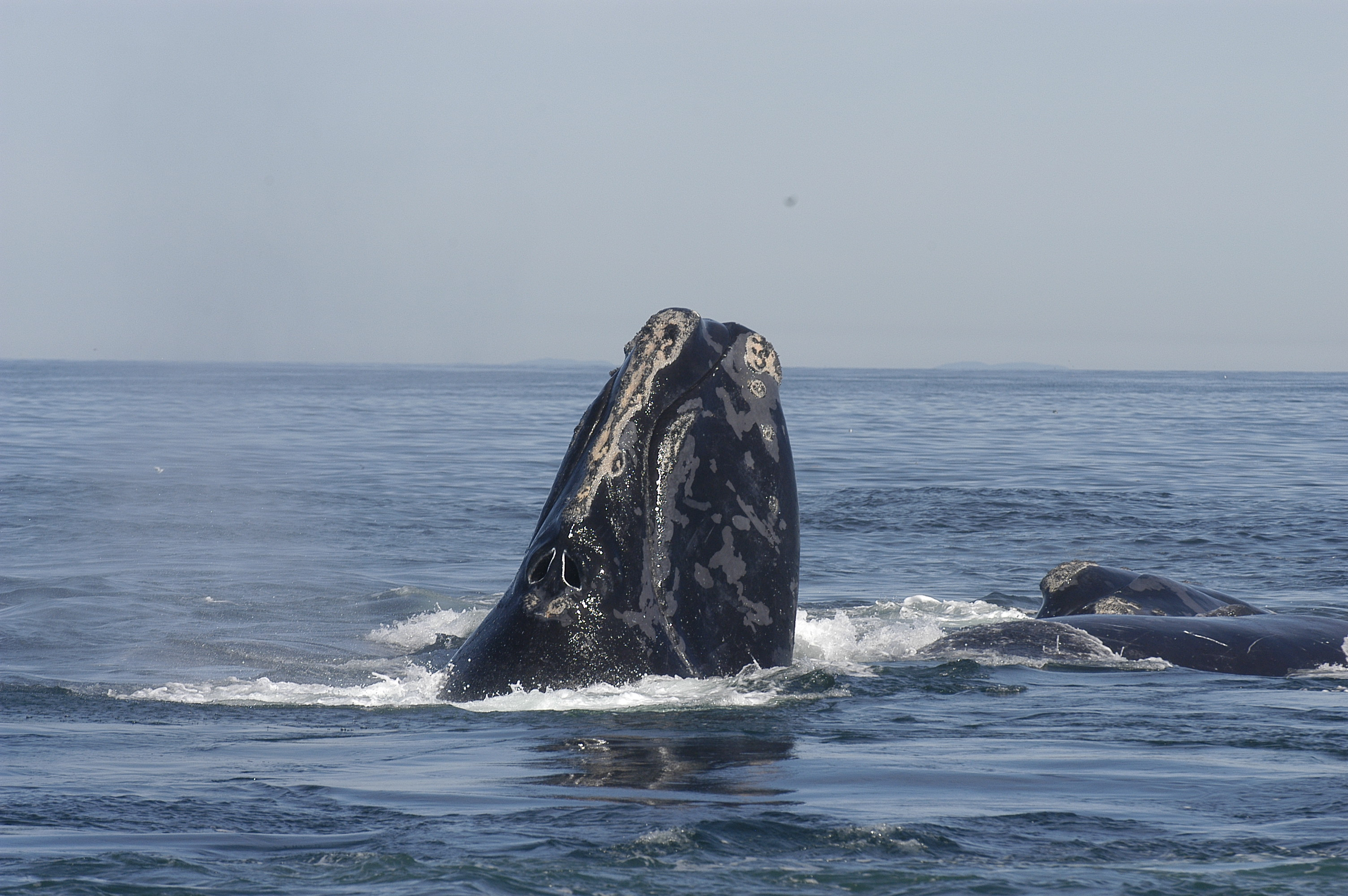
"SAG" (Surface Active Group)

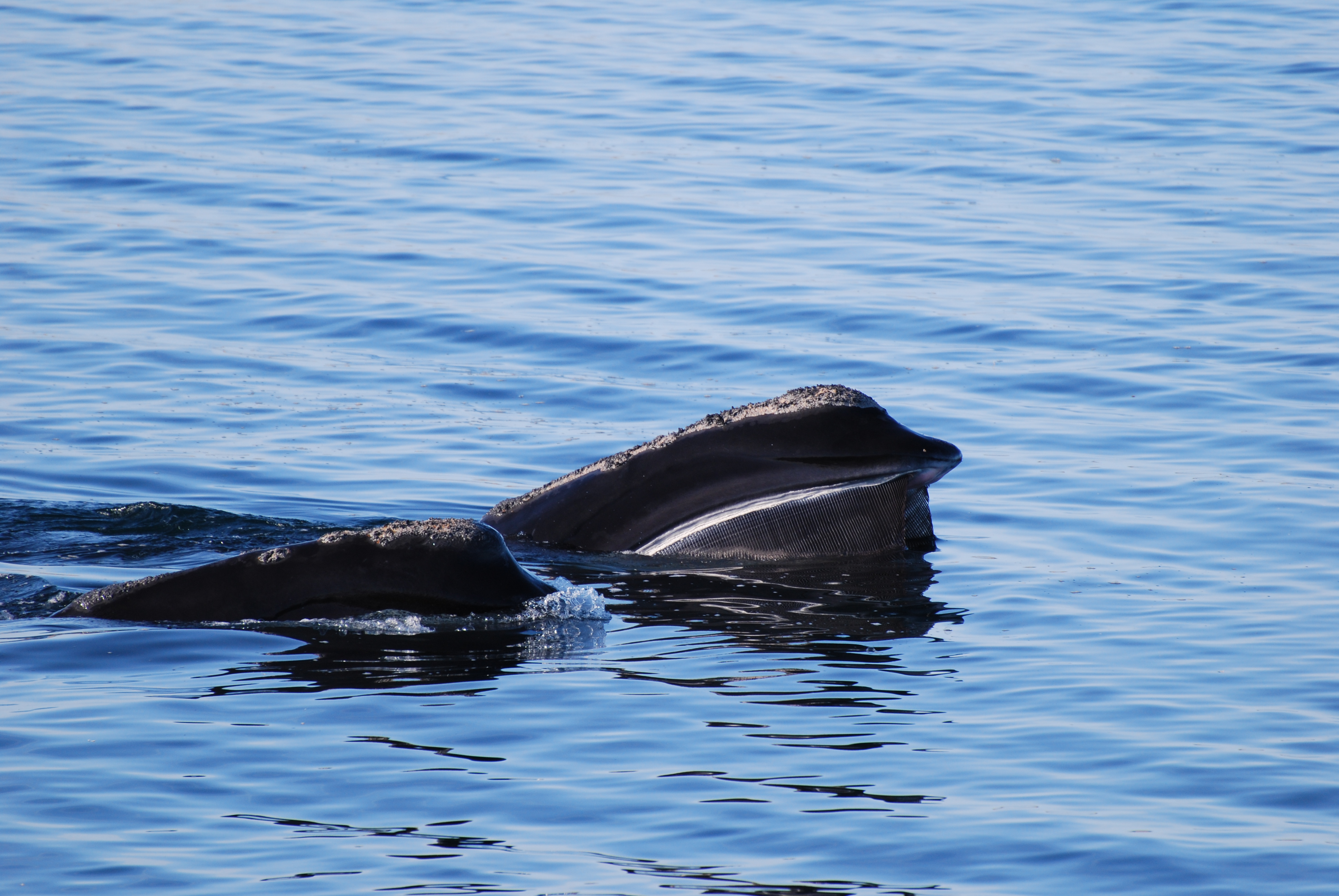
Skim feeding

Aside from mating activities performed by groups of single female and several males, so called SAG (Surface Active Group), North Atlantic right whales seem less active compared to subspecies in southern hemisphere. However, this could be due to intense difference in number of surviving individuals, especially calves that tend to be more curious and playful than adults, and small amount of observations. They are also known to interact with other baleen whales especially with humpback whales or bottlenose dolphins.

=== Vocalization ===
Right whales use low frequency sounds to navigate, locate food, and communicate.

=== Reproduction ===
North Atlantic right whales are promiscuous breeders. They first give birth at age nine or ten after a year-long gestation; the interval between births seems to have increased since the 1990s, and now averages three to six years. Calves are 13–15 feet (4.0–4.6 m) long at birth and weigh approximately 3,000 pounds (1,400 kg). The North Atlantic right whale's penis can reach at least 1.8 m (5 ft 11 in) in length.

=== Predation ===
The only known predator of the North Atlantic right whale is the killer whale. There is one recorded case of predation.

=== Feeding ===
Right whales feed mainly on copepods and other small invertebrates such as krill, pteropods, and larval barnacles, generally by slowly skimming through patches of concentrated prey at or below the ocean surface. Sei whales and basking sharks (sometimes minke whales as well) are in positions as food competitors and are known to feed in the same areas, swimming next to each other, but there have not been any conflicts observed between these species.

== Taxonomy ==
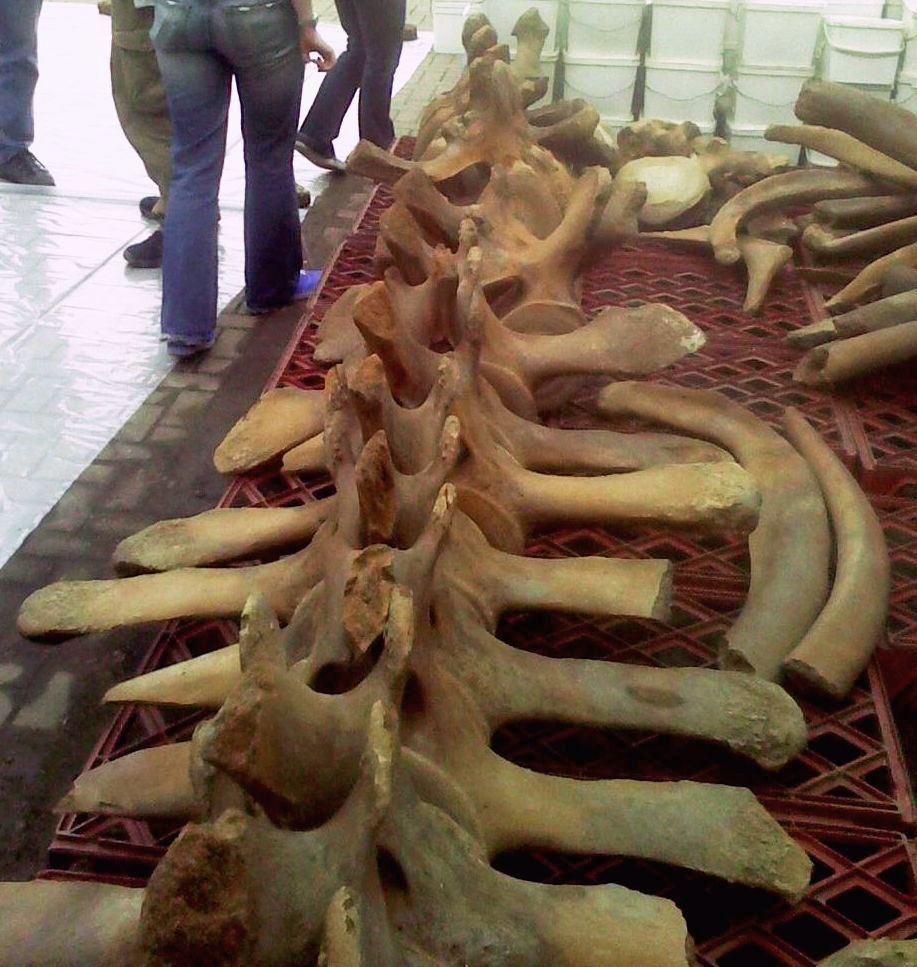
North Atlantic right whale skeleton found on the Thames in 2010 at Bay Wharf, Greenwich

The whale's scientific name is Eubalaena glacialis, which means "good, or true, whale of the ice".

The cladogram is a tool for visualizing and comparing the evolutionary relationships between taxa. The point where a node branches off is analogous to an evolutionary branching – the diagram can be read left-to-right, much like a timeline. The following cladogram of the family Balaenidae serves to illustrate the current scientific consensus as to the relationships between the North Atlantic right whale and the other members of its family.

Family Balaenidae

- Family Balaenidae
  - Eubalaena (right whales)
    - E. glacialis North Atlantic right whale
    - - E. japonica North Pacific right whale
      - E. australis Southern right whale
  - Balaena (bowhead whales)
    B. mysticetus bowhead whale

The right whale family, Balaenidae

Another so-called species of right whale, the "Swedenborg whale" as proposed by Emanuel Swedenborg in the 18th century, was by scientific consensus once thought to be the North Atlantic right whale. However, the 2013 results of DNA analysis of those fossil bones revealed that they were in fact those of the bowhead whale.

== Whaling ==
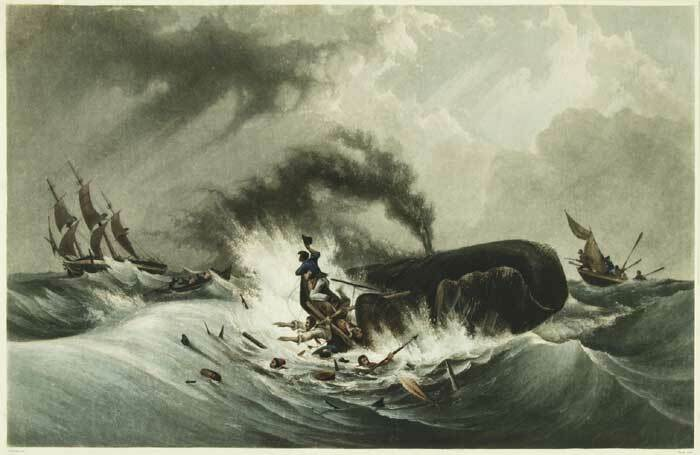
Whaling in small wooden boats with hand harpoons was a hazardous enterprise, even when hunting the "right" whale.

As the "right" whale continued to float long after being killed, it was possible to 'flense' or strip the whale of blubber without having to take it on board ship. Combined with the right whale's lack of speed through water, feeding habits, and coastal habitat, they were easy to catch, even for whalers equipped only with wooden boats and hand-held harpoons.

Basques were the first to commercially hunt this species. They began whaling in the Bay of Biscay as early as the eleventh century. The whales were hunted initially for whale oil, but, as meat preservation technology improved, their value as food increased. Basque whalers reached eastern Canada by 1530. The last Basque whaling voyages were made prior to the commencement of the Seven Years' War (1756–1763). A few attempts were made to revive the trade, but they failed. Shore whaling continued sporadically into the 19th century. It had previously been assumed that Basque whaling in eastern Canada had been the primary cause for the depletion of the sub-population in the western North Atlantic, but later genetic studies disproved this.

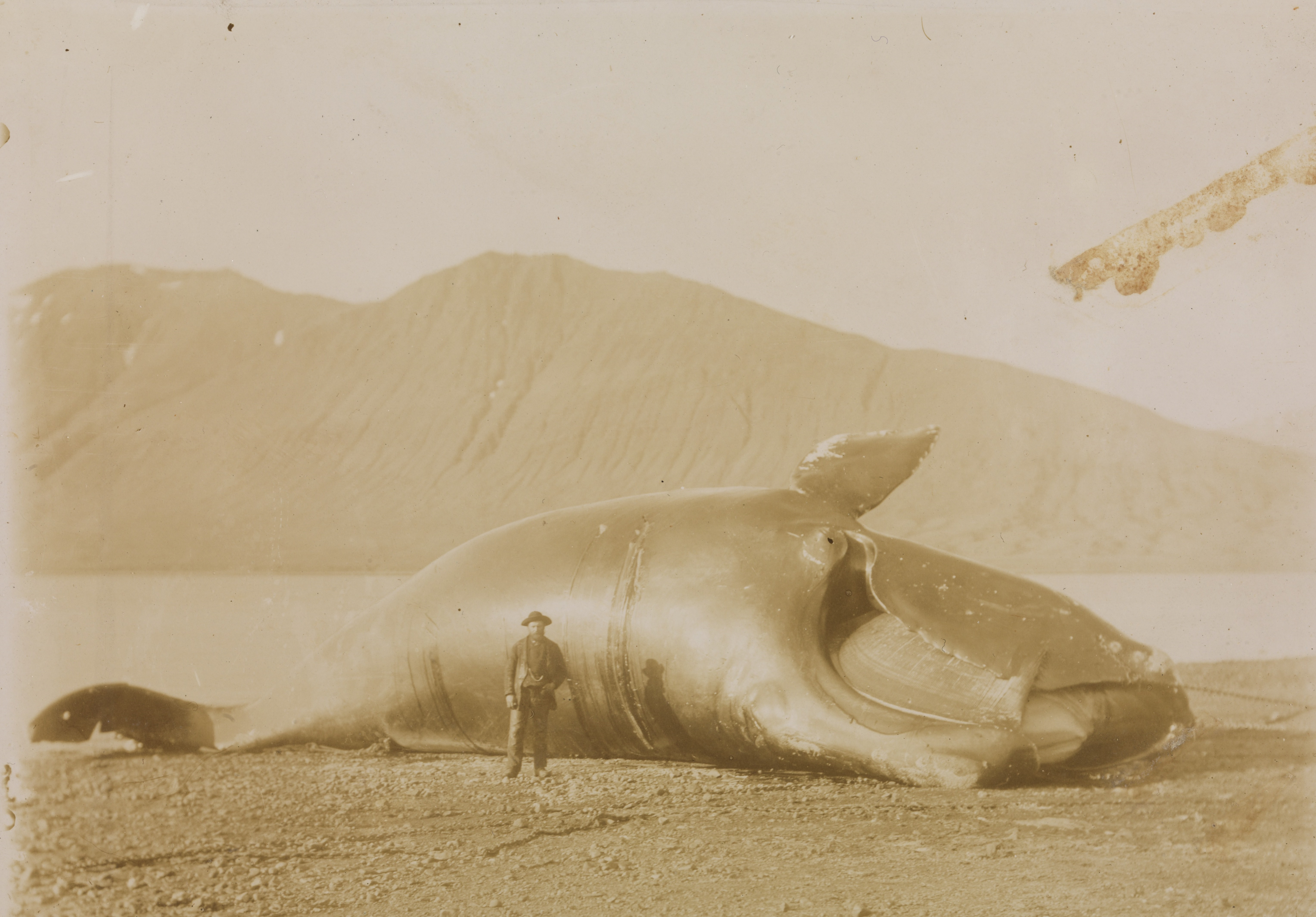
A 46-foot long whale, possibly taken by Captain L. Berg in Dyre Fjord (is) during a marine research expedition to the Norwegian Sea, Iceland and Jan Mayen in the 19th century (by Fridtjof Nansen)

Setting out from Nantucket and New Bedford in Massachusetts and from Long Island, New York, Americans took up to one hundred right whales each year, with the records including one report of 29 whales killed in Cape Cod Bay in a single day during January 1700. By 1750, the North Atlantic right whale population was, for commercial purposes, depleted. Yankee whalers moved into the South Atlantic before the end of the 18th century. The population was so low by the mid-19th century that the famous Whitby whaler Rev. William Scoresby, son of the successful British whaler William Scoresby senior (1760–1829), claimed to have never seen a right whale (although he mainly hunted bowhead whales off eastern Greenland, outside the normal range of right whales).

Based on back calculations using the present population size and growth rate, the population may have numbered fewer than 100 individuals by 1935. As it became clear that hunting right whales was unsustainable, international protection for right whales came into effect, as the practice was banned globally in 1937. The ban was largely successful, although violations continued for several decades. Madeira took its last two right whales in 1967.

== Threats ==
For the period 1970 to October 2006, humans have been responsible for 48% of the 73 documented deaths of the North Atlantic right whale. A 2001 forecast showed a declining population trend in the late 1990s, and indicated a high probability that North Atlantic right whales would go extinct within 200 years if the then-existing anthropogenic mortality rate was not curtailed. The combined factors of small population size and low annual reproductive rate of right whales mean that a single death represents a significant increase in mortality rate. Conversely, significant reduction in the mortality rate can be obtained by preventing just a few deaths. It was calculated that preventing the deaths of just two females per year would enable the population to stabilize. The data suggests, therefore, that human sources of mortality may have a greater effect relative to population growth rates of North Atlantic right whales than for other whales. The principal factors known to be retarding growth and recovery of the population are ship strikes and entanglement with fishing gear.

=== Ship strikes ===
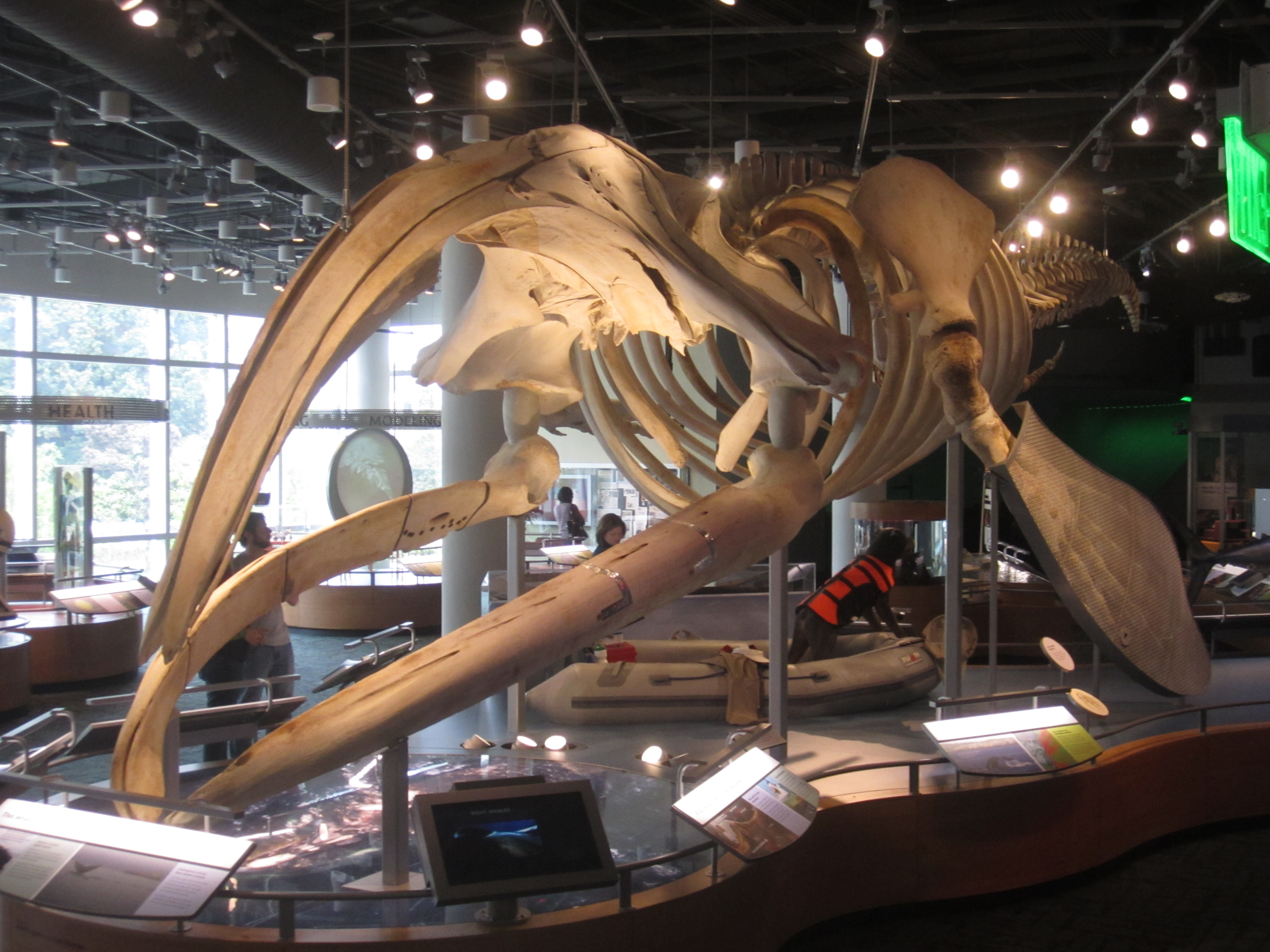
Skeleton of "Stumpy", a North Atlantic right whale whose death by ship strike helped lead to laws that require slower cargo ship speeds in whale migration routes.

The single greatest danger to this species is injury sustained from ship strikes. Between 1970 and October 2006, 37% of all recorded North Atlantic right whale deaths were attributed to collisions. During the years 1999–2003, incidents of mortality and serious injury attributed to ship strikes averaged 1 per year. For the years 2004–2006, that number increased to 2.6. Additionally, it is possible that the official figures underestimate the actual ship-strike mortality rates, since whales struck in offshore areas may never be sighted due to low search effort.

In 2003, the International Maritime Organization shifted the location of the Traffic Separation Scheme (TSS, i.e. shipping lanes) in the Bay of Fundy (and approaches) from an area with the highest density of North Atlantic right whales to an area of lower density. This was the first time the IMO had changed a TSS to help protect marine mammals. In 2006, the US National Oceanic and Atmospheric Administration (NOAA) established a set of recommended vessel routes to reduce ship strikes in four important eastern-US right whale habitats. In 2007, and again on June 1, 2009, NOAA changed the TSS servicing Boston to reduce vessel collisions with right whales and other whale species. NOAA estimated that implementing an "Area To Be Avoided" (ATBA) and narrowing the TSS by 1 nautical mile (1.9 km) would reduce the relative risk of right whale ship strikes by 74% during April–July (63% from the ATBA and 11% from the narrowing of the TSS). In 2008, the National Marine Fisheries Service (NMFS) and NOAA enacted a series of vessel speed restrictions to reduce ship collisions with North Atlantic right whales for ships in certain areas along the East Coast of the United States in order to reduce the probability of fatal ship strikes.

=== Fishing gear entanglement ===
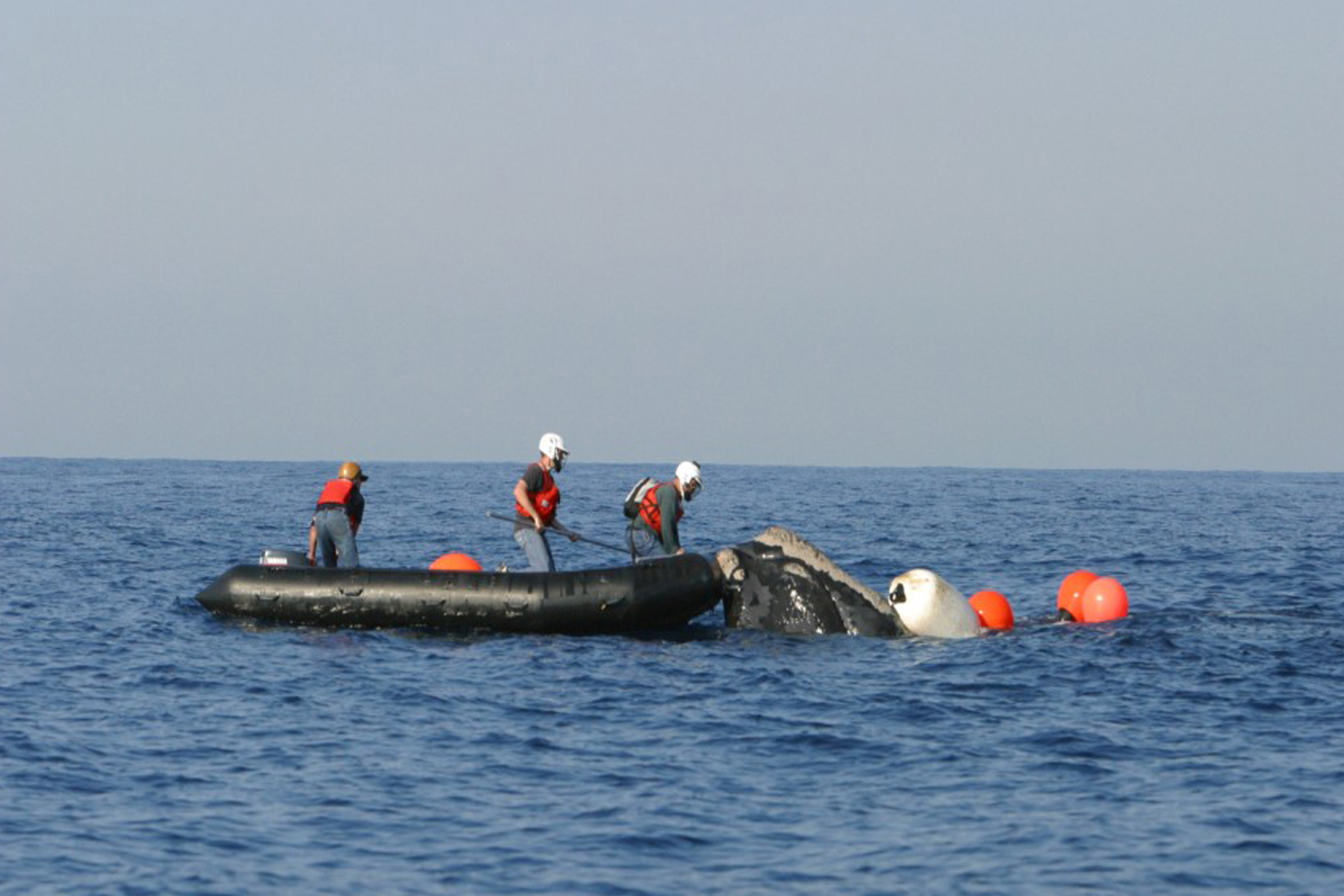
Disentanglement by NOAA staff off Jacksonville, Florida

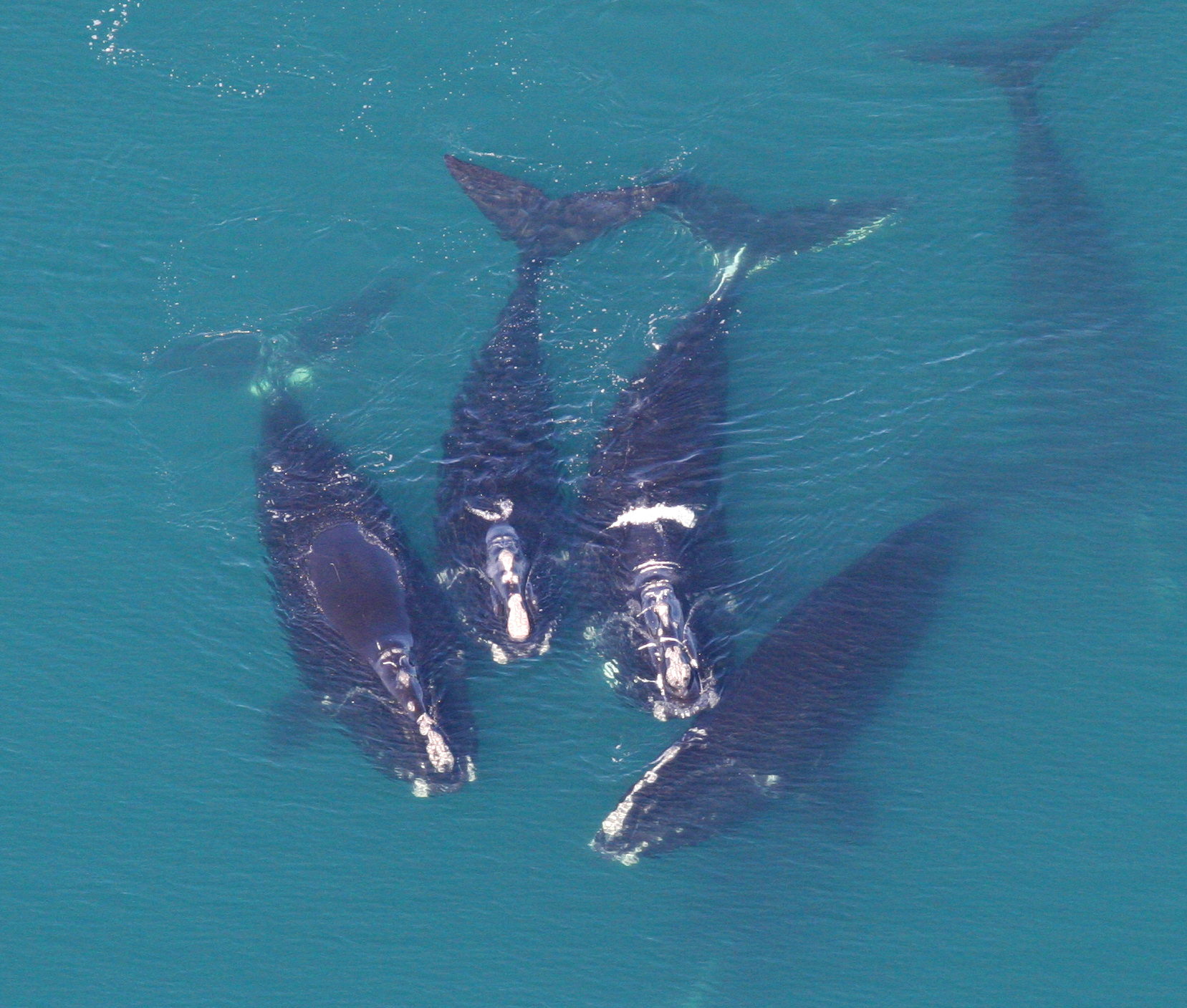
Scars by vessel collisions and entanglements are visible.

The next greatest source of human-induced mortality is entanglement in fixed fishing gear such as bottom-set groundfish gillnet gear, cod traps and lobster pots. Between 1970 and October 2006, there have been 8 instances where entanglements have been the direct cause of death of North Atlantic right whales. This represents 11% of all deaths documented during that period. From 1986 to 2005, there were a total of 61 confirmed reports of entanglements, including the aforementioned mortalities. It is likely that official figures underestimate the actual impacts of entanglement. Entanglement is stressful on the animal, and repeated entanglement can lead to depleted blubber reserves. It is believed that chronically entangled animals may in fact sink upon death due to loss of buoyancy from depleted blubber reserves, and therefore escape detection.

According to a 2012 New England Aquarium report, 85 percent of the whales have had rope entanglement at least one time and it is the leading cause of death.

A whale that survives an entanglement episode may be weakened, have reduced fertility, or become vulnerable to further injury. Because whales often free themselves of gear following an entanglement event, scarring may be a better indicator of fisheries interaction than entanglement sightings. A 2012 analysis of the scarification of right whales over the years 1980 to 2009 showed that 82.9% of all North Atlantic right whales experienced at least one fishing gear entanglement, 59.0% have had more than one such experience, and an average of 15.5% of the population are entangled in fishing gear annually.

In 2007, so as to protect northern right whales from serious injury or mortality from entanglement in gillnet gear in their calving area in Atlantic Ocean waters off the southeast United States, the National Marine Fisheries Service (NMFS) revised regulations implementing the Atlantic Large Whale Take Reduction Plan (ALWTRP). This plan expands the restricted area to include the waters off of South Carolina, Georgia, and Northern Florida. It also prohibits gillnet fishing or even gillnet possession in those waters for a period of five months, beginning on November 15 of each year, which coincides with the annual right whale calving season.

When entanglement prevention efforts fail, disentanglement efforts occasionally succeed, despite the fact that such efforts are more frequently impossible or unsuccessful. Nevertheless, they do in fact make a significant difference because saving a few whales in a population of only 400 has a large positive effect against mortality rates. Between 2004–2008 there were at least four documented cases of entanglements for which the intervention of disentanglement teams averted a likely death of a right whale. For the first time in 2009 and again in 2011, scientists successfully used chemical sedation of an entangled whale to reduce stress on the animal and to reduce the time spent working with it. After disentangling the whale, scientists attached a satellite tracking tag, administered a dose of antibiotics to treat entanglement wounds and then another drug to reverse the sedation. Despite concerns that the trauma might impair reproduction, researchers confirmed in January 2013 that three disentangled whales had given birth.

Due to recently increased presences of right whales in Cape Breton to St. Lawrence regions, increases in entanglements and possible ship strikes have been confirmed as well including serious fatal cases involving three whales between June 24 and July 13, 2015.

A female known as Snow Cone gained attention in September 2022 after being spotted off the coast of Massachusetts dragging fishing gear. The 17-year-old whale, who had been continuously entangled for at least 18 months, and was covered in lice and swimming slowly, was considered beyond saving by scientists.

Debates about the risk of fishing gear entanglement for right whales have unfolded in media and policy arenas, with a focus on an on-going debate between whale conservation advocates and the people comprising the fishing industry. Research shows that the conflict was most recently at its most intense from 2019 to 2023. In 2022, the Marine Stewardship Council revoked its certification for the commercial Gulf of Maine lobster fishery, citing risks of entanglement of North American right whales in lobster-fishing gear. The same year, Seafood Watch added the American and Canadian Maine lobster fisheries to its "red list" of seafood species to avoid, for the same reason. The MSC and Seafood Watch led some retailers to stop selling Maine lobster. The decision was welcomed by whale-conservation groups, but opposed by the Maine lobster industry and elected officials in Maine, where the fishery is economically important. Maine's Congressional delegation in both chambers effectively retaliated later that year during the drafting of an essential omnibus spending bill that was necessary to prevent a widespread shutdown of the federal government. Several provisions related to right whale science, conservation, and management were included, the most notable of which was an explicit ban on new or stricter fishing regulations relevant to the lobster fishery until December, 2028, effectively changing the course of right whale conservation and management for the remainder of the decade. United States president Joe Biden signed the Consolidated Appropriations Act of 2023 into law on December 29, 2022.

=== Noise ===
Noise caused by ships, seismic surveys used in oil exploration, and pile driving cause background noise that can disrupt right whale communication.

A 2011 analysis of data collected in the Bay of Fundy has shown that exposure to low-frequency ship noise may be associated with chronic physiological stress in North Atlantic right whales. Following the September 11 attacks, maritime activity in the Bay of Fundy, a crucial calving and nursing ground for right whales, experienced a marked reduction in both ship traffic and density. Analysis of fecal matter collections from right whales in the region unveiled a noteworthy decline in fecal glucocorticoid (fGC) stress hormones post-9/11 compared to pre-9/11. This data demonstrates a correlation between ship traffic noise and stress levels in the right whale population.

Heightened ambient noise from increased ship activity may contribute to chronic stress in these marine mammals. Prolonged elevation of fGC stress hormones is associated with adverse effects on growth rate, reproduction, and overall immune health emphasizing the potential dangers of anthropogenic noise disturbances to the overall health of this already critically endangered species.

The US Navy proposed plans to build a new undersea naval sonar training range immediately adjacent to northern right whale calving grounds in shallow waters off the Florida-Georgia border. In September 2012, legal challenges by 12 environmental groups were denied in federal court, allowing the Navy to proceed.

=== Climate change ===
Anthropogenic climate change poses a clear and growing threat to right whales. Documented effects in the scientific literature include impacts on reproduction, range, prey access, interactions with human activities, and individual health condition.

Climate-driven changes to ocean circulation and water temperatures have affected the species' foraging and habitat use patterns, with numerous harmful consequences. Warming waters lead to decreased abundance of an important prey species, the zooplankton Calanus finmarchicus. This reduction in prey availability affects the health of the right whale population in numerous ways. The most direct impacts are on the survival and reproductive success of individual whales, as lower C. finmarchicus densities have been associated with malnutrition-related health issues and difficulties successfully giving birth to and rearing calves.

In 1998, zooplankton populations dropped dramatically following a climate shift. Though zooplankton abundance began to rise again in 1999, right whales have such a long reproduction and migratory cycle that the population was greatly affected by the minimal food availability from the year before. In 1999, only one right whale calf was born, compared to the 21 that were born in 1996, before the climate shift. In 2001, after the zooplankton populations greatly recovered, 30 calves were born.

Zooplankton abundance has been found to be associated with the North Atlantic Oscillation (NAO), the most influential climate force in the Northern Hemisphere. Periodically, pressure anomalies in the system shift from positive to negative as determined by the NAO Index, affecting temperatures and wind patterns. Abundant zooplankton populations have been linked to a positive NAO Index. As global temperatures increase, the NAO is predicted to shift more often and to greater intensities (so-called marine heatwaves). These shifts will likely greatly affect the abundance of zooplankton, posing a great risk for right whale populations that cannot rapidly adapt to a new food source.

Decreased abundance of C. finmarchicus as well as shifting seasonal temperature and ocean circulation patterns have also driven right whales to feed in different places and at different time of years compared to historical data. This has meant whales are present in habitats and times of year that are not accounted for by existing regulations intended to protect them from threats such as vessel strikes and gear entanglements. This has led to an increase in whale deaths alongside the decrease in births, which together account for recent population decline. Even without accounting for deaths which are unreported and undocumented, the number of whale deaths between 2017 and 2020 exceeded the number of births, a trend that could lead to extinction if unaddressed.

=== 2017 unusual mortality event ===
The Marine Mammal Protection Act (MMPA) defines an unusual mortality event (UME) as "a stranding event that is unexpected, involves a significant die-off of any marine mammal population, and demands immediate response." A UME for the North Atlantic right whale population has been active since 2017, a year where the population of under 400 individuals experienced 35 mortalities and morbidities. The most common direct causes of the deaths and injuries associated with the recent UME have been the same as ever (vessel strikes and entanglements), but there is an underlying connection to climate change. The temperature, circulation, and prey abundance changes associated with climate change have driven right whales to occupy new habitats (or existing habitats at new times of year), exposing them to anthropogenic threats outside of the scope of protective regulations. In particular, Canada's Gulf of St. Lawrence was the site of 17 right whale deaths and injuries during the summer of 2017; research has since shown that whales had recently begun using the region consistently for the first time. One study found that the UME served as the focusing event that launched an issue-attention cycle and brought the topic into broader public view through media. The UME also inspired two documentary films, the first to focus entirely on right whales, Entangled (2020, dir. David Abel) and Last of the Right Whales (2021, dir. Nadine Pequeneza). The films debuted amid the COVID-19 pandemic. Each took a different approach to their storytelling, with Entangled focusing on issues related to science, conservation, and conflict in New England and Last of the Right Whales focusing on the northern and southern habitats and human interest stories of the people who have connections to the whales. A research study analyzes and discusses the contents of the two films and took the rare opportunity to compare and contrast them.

== Population and distribution ==
It is not known how many populations of North Atlantic right whales existed prior to whaling, but the majority of studies usually consider that there were historically two populations, one each in the eastern and western North Atlantic. There are however two other hypotheses which claim, respectively, one super-population among the entire North Atlantic (with mixing of eastern and western migratory routes occurring at locations in relatively high latitudes such as in the Denmark Strait), and three sub-populations of eastern, western, and central Atlantic right whales (with the central stock ranging from Greenland's Cape Farewell in summer to the Azores, Bermuda, and Bahamas in winter, although recent study indicates that the Azores had probably been a migratory corridor rather than a wintering ground).

Recent studies revealed that modern counterparts of the eastern and western populations are genetically much closer to each other than previously thought. Right whales' habitat can be affected dramatically by climate changes along with Bowhead whales.

=== Western population ===
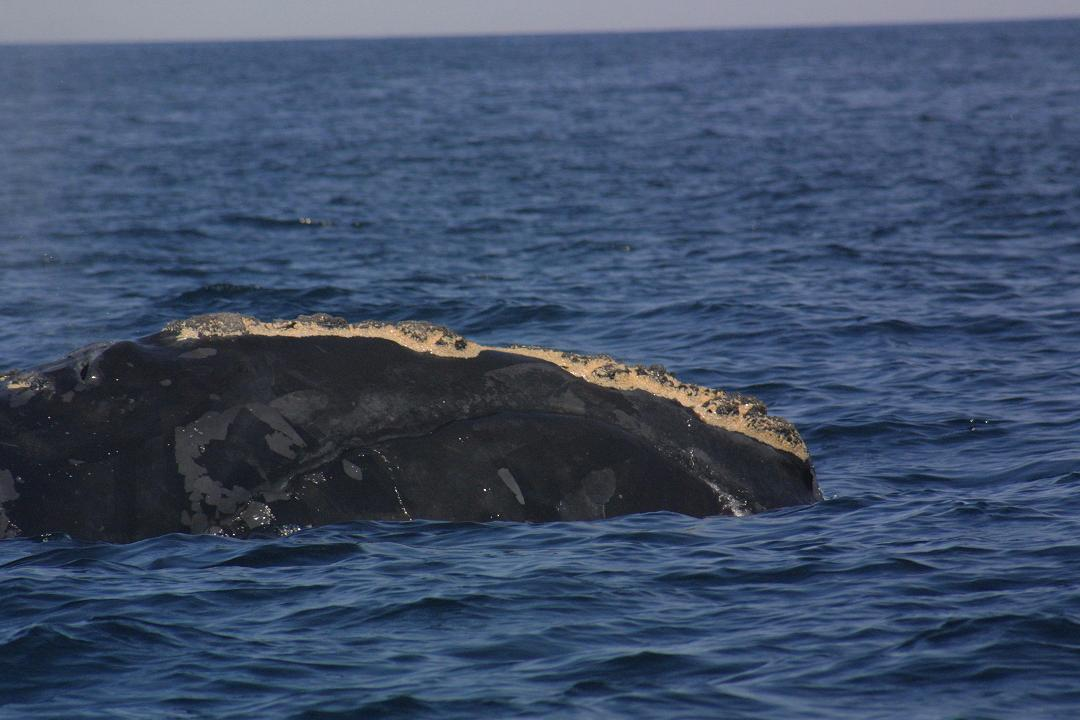
Continuous callosities are visible which are distinctive to the Atlantic species.

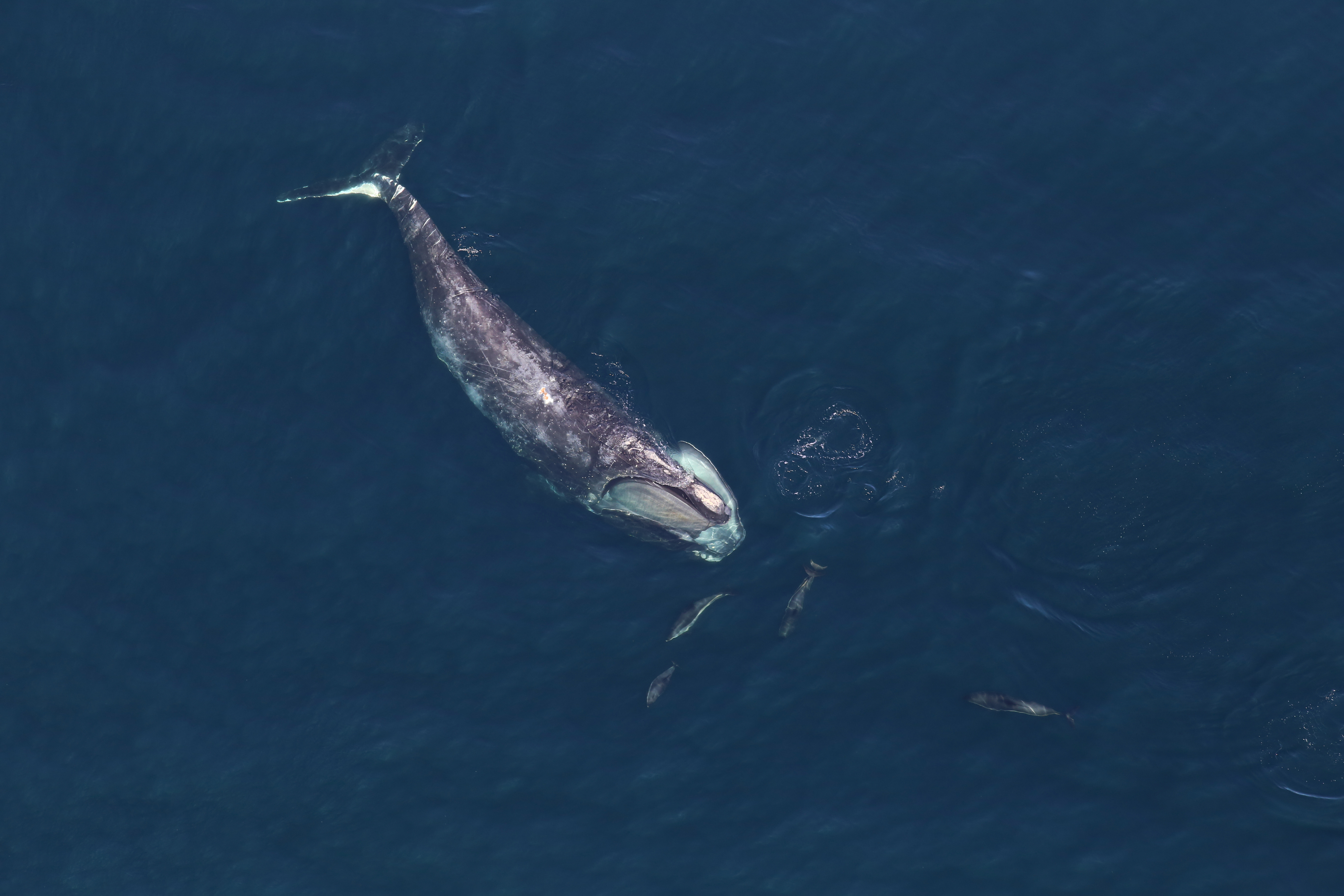
Interacting with Atlantic white-sided dolphins

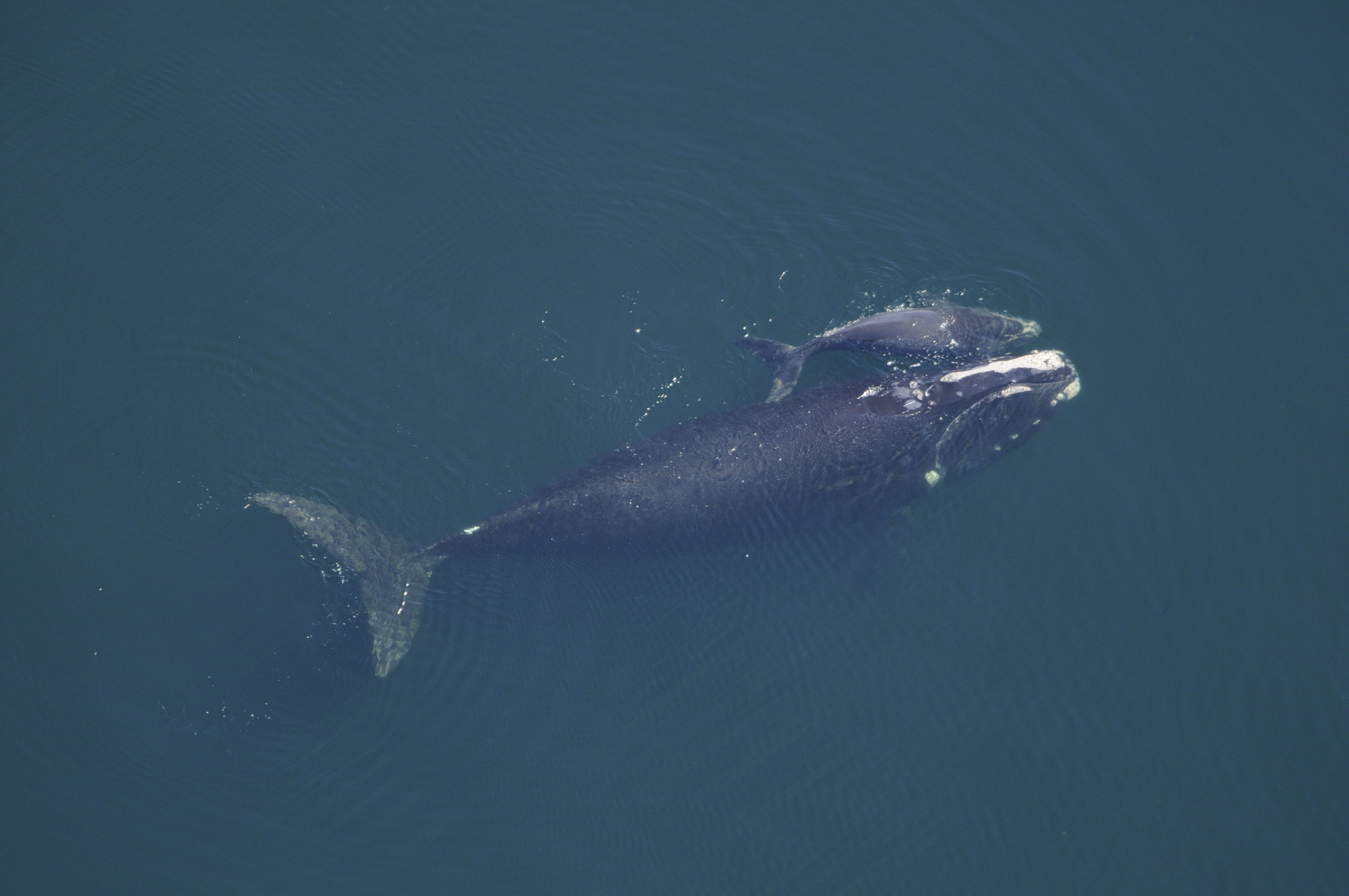
Cow and calf

In spring, summer and autumn, the western North Atlantic population feeds in a range stretching from Massachusetts to Newfoundland. Particularly popular feeding areas are the Bay of Fundy, the Gulf of Maine and Cape Cod Bay. In winter, they head south towards Georgia and Florida to give birth. According to census of individual whales identified using photo-identification techniques, the latest available stock assessment data (August 2012) indicates that a minimum of 396 recognized individuals were known to be alive in the western North Atlantic in 2010, up from 361 in 2005. Distributions within other parts of Bay of Fundy is rather unknown, although whales are occasionally observed at various locations in northern parts such as in Baxters Harbour or at Campobello Island.

Though their numbers are still scarce, some right whales migrate regularly into the Gulf of St. Lawrence, notably around the Gaspé Peninsula and in the Chaleur Bay, and up to Anticosti Island, Tadoussac and in the St. Lawrence River such as at Rouge Island. Until 1994, whales were regarded as rather vagrant migrants into St. Lawrence region, however annual concentrations of whales were discovered off Percé in 1995 and sightings in entire St. Lawrence regions have been shown gradual increases since in 1998. For example, in the survey conducted by the Canadian Whale Institute in 2006, three whales were detected off the peninsula. Some whales including cow and calf pairs also appear around Cape Breton Island with notable increasing regularities in recent years, notably since in 2014, and about 35 to 40 whales were confirmed around Prince Edward Island and Gaspe Peninsula in 2015. Further, the whales' regular range is known to reach up to off Newfoundland and the Labrador Sea, and several have been found in a former whaling ground east of Greenland's southern tip.

Parts of the western group, especially for those seen regularly in the Gulf of St. Lawrence, display different migratory or calving routines than other whales and these are so-called "Offshore Whales". There could be various areas along or off the west coasts where could have been frequented by whales potentially and might be re-colonized in the future such as Quoddy, Eastport, Plymouth Harbor, Sagamore Beach, Island of Nantucket, Florida Bay, Pamlico Sound, Gulf of Mexico (as far as to Texas), Bahamas, Long Island Sound and vicinity to New York City, the mouth of Potomac River, Delaware and Chesapeake Bay, the mouth of Altamaha River, Cape Canaveral, Sebastian Inlet and around Melbourne. As the population grows, it's also highly possible that more whales would start using rivers or river mouths, shallow estuaries, smaller inlets or bays. Whales have already seen repeatedly at various of these such as Indian River Inlet, Delaware River, Cape Cod Canal, and Jacksonville Drum.

In early 2009, scientists recorded a record number of births among the western North Atlantic population. 39 new calves were recorded, born off the Atlantic coast of Florida and Georgia:

"Right whales, for the first time in a long time, are doing their part: they're having the babies; they're having record numbers of babies. We need to be vigilant and still do our part to prevent the whales from being killed."

— Monica Zani, New England Aquarium

In contrast, 2012 was the worst calving season since 2000, with only seven calves sighted – and one of those was believed to have died. This is significantly below the annual average of 20 calves per year over the last decade. As the gestation period for right whales is a year long, researchers believe that a lack of food in the whales' summer feeding grounds in the Bay of Fundy during the summer of 2010 may be linked to the poor season in 2012. The right whale was purported to have reached a population of 500 in the North Atlantic, which was assumed to have been achieved for the first time in centuries, when counted in 2013. The population of the whale has been increasing at about 2.5 percent per year, but this is below the optimal goal of 6 or 7 percent that researchers were hoping to attain.

There were 411 individual left in 2019, when calves were born after a barren 2018. By 2021, the population was estimated to be down to 350 whales.

In 2023, the whale population showed a slight increase from previous years, estimated at 372.

In November 2026, the North Atlantic Right Whale Consortium released an estimate of 382 whales, about 2 percent below the previous year's estimate.

Aerial and shipboard surveys are conducted annually to locate and record seasonal distribution of North Atlantic right whales along the northeast and southeast United States coast. Researchers identify individual right whales, document whale behavior, monitor new calves, and respond to entangled whales. The surveys have been used to produce seasonal maps showing the density of right whales (number of animals per square kilometer) throughout the U.S. east coast and Nova Scotia. NOAA Fisheries maintains an interactive map of recent right whale sightings.

=== Eastern population ===
In the eastern North Atlantic, the right whale population probably numbers in the low double digits at best, with little information known about their distribution and migration pattern. Scientists believe that this population may be functionally extinct. The last catch occurred in February 1967 from a pod of three animals including a cow-calf pair: one escaped in Madeira and one was taken in the Azores.

Cintra Bay and Bahia Gorrei, about 150 kilometers south of Villa Cisneros in the Western Sahara, the only known historical calving ground for this group, host no animals (or if any, then likely very few) nowadays, holding a situation similar to the Bay of Biscay area where many whales once congregated throughout years. Although there were several sightings in the late 20th century (see Bay of Biscay) and catch records indicate whales historically used the bay for both feeding and wintering, it is still unclear whether or not the Biscayne coasts were ever used as calving grounds. Other parts of coastlines or oceanic islands from Iberian Peninsula and Portugal to Morocco in north to south possibly reaching even Mauritania to Senegal. Locations such as Dakhla Peninsula and Bay of Arguin had been served potentially as wintering grounds similar to the Cintra and Gorrei Bays region. Historic presence of any summering or wintering grounds within the Mediterranean Basin including Black and Azov Sea is unknown although it has been considered to be feasible.

Entire European regions including French coasts, Hebrides, North and Baltic Seas, and further north up to Swedish, and Norwegian areas were once ranged by whales. Phenology of catch records in the early twentieth century in Nordic countries shows that whale presences in northern waters was at peak in June. In Ireland, catches were concentrated in the first half of June until 1930s and preceded catch in the Scottish bases of the Hebrides which were concentrated in the second half of June and July, and this indicates that those whales were likely to migrate along Irish coasts. Of all modern whaling grounds in European waters, Hebrides and the Shetland Islands were the center of whaling in the early 20th century, and any records afterwards these catches became scarce in eastern Atlantic where only two cow-calf pairs had been documented.

Any calm waters in north such as Porth Neigwl, the Wadden Sea region, Cornwall coasts, Moray Firth and in Irish Sea could have been migratory colliders/feeding or resting grounds, or seasonal habitats to stay for less-migrating or resident (fully or partially) individuals. Some might have reached to entrance of Baltic Sea and northern Scandinavian. Based on historical records, Scandinavian waters once had been a potential feeding area, and this idea corresponds with behaviors of the below mentioned vagrant individual "Porter" recorded in 1999 when he stayed in the fjord for several weeks, indicating the area provided to him a feasible condition for summering. Historical records suggest that summering grounds could have reached further north to northern coasts of Scandinavian Peninsula, and some might have turned up at the mouth of Hudson Bay.

Predicted summering range models suggest that small numbers of right whales could have been present year-round in the Mediterranean Sea although it is unclear whether whales ever penetrated Turkish Straits to Marmara, Black, and Azov Seas (historical presences at northern Aegean Sea were considered in this study which didn't include the northernmost basins in study areas).

==== Sightings and confirmations in recent years ====
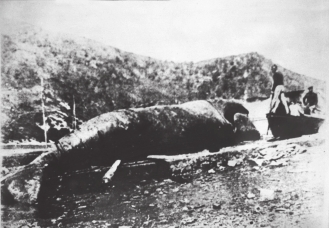
The last whale killed in Orio

There have been a few sightings further east over the past few decades, with several sightings close to Iceland in 2003. There was speculation that these could be the remains of a virtually extinct Eastern Atlantic stock, but examination of old whalers' records suggest that they are more likely to be strays from further west. A few have been sighted in waters adjacent to Norway (two documented sightings in 1926 and 1999), Ireland, shelf waters west of Scotland, Irish Sea, the Bay of Biscay in Spain, off the Iberian Peninsula, a cow-calf pair at Cape St. Vincent in Portugal, and continuous sightings of a single animal off the southwestern Tenerife in the Canary Islands in 1995. Subsequently, there have been two more sightings in Benderlau, La Gomera and some other observations were reported in Portugal and Galicia. A whale of unknown species, thought to be a right whale, was seen off Steenbanken, Schouwen-Duiveland (Netherlands) in July 2005 and was possibly the same animal previously seen off Texel in the West Frisian Islands. Another possible sighting was made along Lizard Point, Cornwall in May 2012.

In the 2000s, sightings have also been recorded from pelagic waters such as off Hebrides and on Rockall Basin. In July 2024, one was spotted off the coast of County Donegal.

Right whales have also on rare occasion been observed in the Mediterranean Sea. Since the two records of a stranding (Italy) and a capture of one of a pair seen (Algeria) in early 20th century, one sighting recorded in Dutch sighting scheme possibly between 1954 and 1957, only one possible sighting have been confirmed. In May 1991, a petty officer of the Italian Navy happened to be in the water with his camera about 13 km (8.1 mi) off the small island of Sant' Antioco (southwestern Sardinia), when a right whale happened to swim by – his photos comprise the only confirmed sighting in the 20th century; on the other hand however, reliability of the record have been questioned due to failures to contact the photographers. Earlier known occurrences of right whales in the basin include the stranding of a juvenile near Taranto (southeastern Italy) in 1877 and the sighting of two (one of which was later captured) in the bay of Castiglione (Algiers) in 1888 and Portugal. The Norway sightings appear to be of vagrants, or strays from the western Atlantic stock. Catch records at Cape Verde Islands in spring-summer seasons are highly doubtful.

Below is a list of some of recent records of right whales in eastern North Atlantic (not all of above-mentioned records and excluding vagrant records, according to the Spanish edition of this article). Records and confirmations close to Newfoundland, Iceland, and Cape Farewell are also excluded.

Year	Location	Type of record	Notes
1805	Hondarribia	Capture	
1854	San Sebastián	Capture	
1878	Getaria, Gipuzkoa	Capture	
1893	San Sebastián	Capture	
1901	Orio	Capture	
1914	Azores	Capture failed	
Prior to 1930	Off the coast of Porto	Capture	
Between 1939 and 1949	Capelinhos, Faial Island	Observation	
Between 1954 and 1957	Mediterranean Sea	Observation	
January 1959	Madeira	Capture (pregnant female)	
1959–1966	Cape Clear Island, Ireland	5 separate observations	
1964	Off Cork, Ireland	Observation (uncertain being included in above records)	
February 1967	Madeira	Capture*	
August 1970	Cape Clear Island, Ireland	Observation	
1977 or 1978 (September)	Cape Finisterre, Galicia 43°00′N 10°30′W	Observation	
June 1980	Bay of Biscay	Observation (two whales)	
July–October 1980	Between Harris and St Kilda, Scotland	Observation	
Second half of 20th century	Dutch coast	Bones found	
July 1987	Mid Atlantic, off Iceland	Observation	
1987	Mid Atlantic, off Spain	Observation	
1993	Near A Coruña, Estaca de Bares, Galicia	Land-based observation (breaching individual)	
1995	Cape St. Vincent, Portugal	Observation (the only cow-calf pair in recent times)	
	Channel between Tenerife and La Gomera	Observation	
	La Gomera	Two separate observations	
	Channel between Tenerife and Gran Canaria	Observation	
	Between Punta de Teno and Punta Scratch	Observation	
Between June 1998 and January 1999	La Gomera	Observation	
1990s or 2000s	Off Donegal	Two observations	
May 2000	Hatton Bank, off Ireland and Britain	Observation	
July 2000	Off northern Shetland Islands	Observation (unclear if duplicate of above)	
2012	Lizard Point, Cornwall	Possible observations (possibly previously encountered by a kayaker in nearby areas)	

* A male accompanied a cow-calf and only the male fled

==== Vagrants from the Western Population ====
Some eastern sightings have been officially confirmed to be of vagrants from the western population. A right whale seen off Cape Cod in May 1999 was later seen in the Kvænangen fjord in Troms, Northern Norway in September 1999. This individual was later confirmed to be "Porter", an adult male in the catalog (No.1133). He was seen again back in Cape Cod in winter 2000, having traveled for over 7,120 miles (11,460 km), making this the longest ever traveling record of right whales. The area vicinity to Scandinavian Peninsula was once in the historical "North Cape Ground", one of the major whaling grounds for this species in the 17th century.

In January 2009, one animal was sighted off Pico Island, Azores, the first confirmed appearance there since 1888. This animal was later identified as a female from the western Atlantic group, and nicknamed as "Pico" according to this event.

Some individuals are known to show interesting patterns of movements which may possibly help researchers to deepen understandings of future re-colonization to eastern Atlantic, if possible.

=== Possible central population ===
Several biologists have mentioned the possibility that a third population exists, which ranges from near Iceland or Greenland in the north to Bermuda or the Bahamas in the south. Some right whales are now said to live primarily in Icelandic waters, occasionally joining up with the western population. In July 2003, a research team from the New England Aquarium investigated the possibility of right whales inhabiting the Cape Farewell region. They recorded a sighting of a female right whale in the Irminger Sea, southwest of the Iceland coast. She was later named "Hidalgo" due to a scar mark on her head resembling a horse.

In 2009, right whales appeared in waters around Greenland although their origin was not confirmed. Prior to this, no right whales had been killed or confirmed present off the coast of Greenland for around 200 years except for the sighting of "1718", a unique animal seen only twice (off Cape Farewell in July 1987 and at the Nova Scotian Shelf in June 1989). Several sightings in the area made in the 1970s may or may not be of right whales, as the critically endangered population of Bowhead whales are also present in the area.

For southward migration, the sighting of two whales displaying courtship behaviors in the Bermuda was recorded by a team of researchers including Roger Payne in April, 1970.

== Conservation status ==
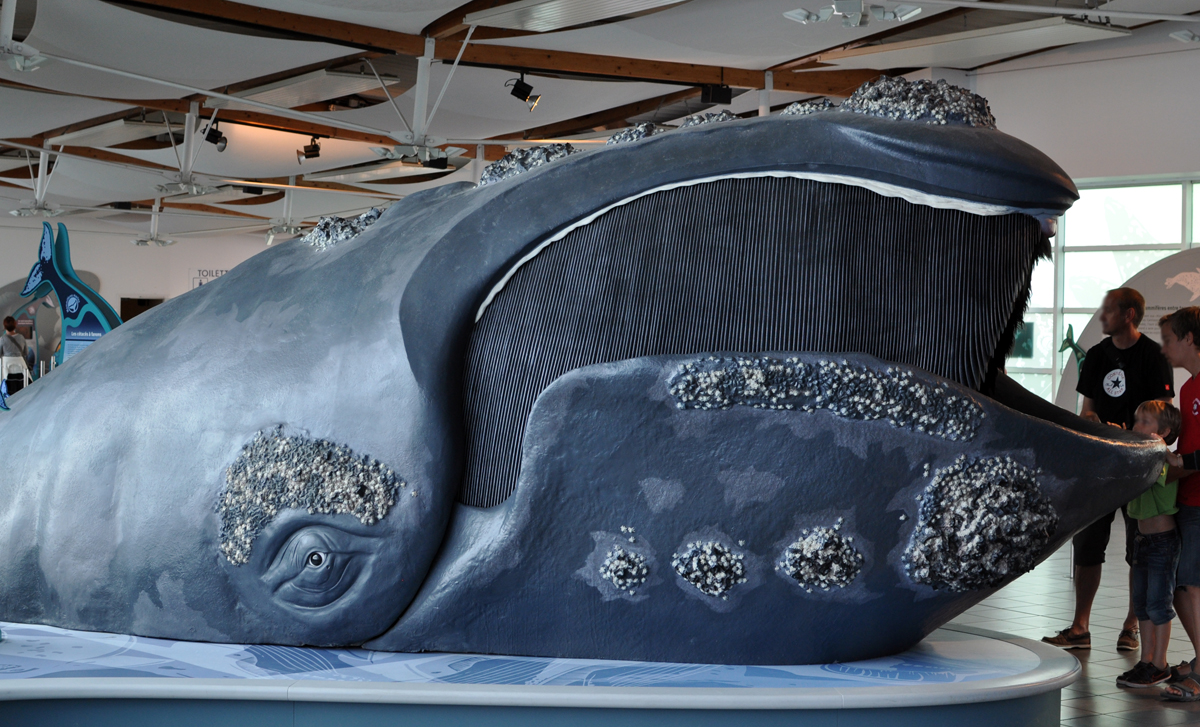
Reconstruction of a North Atlantic right whale

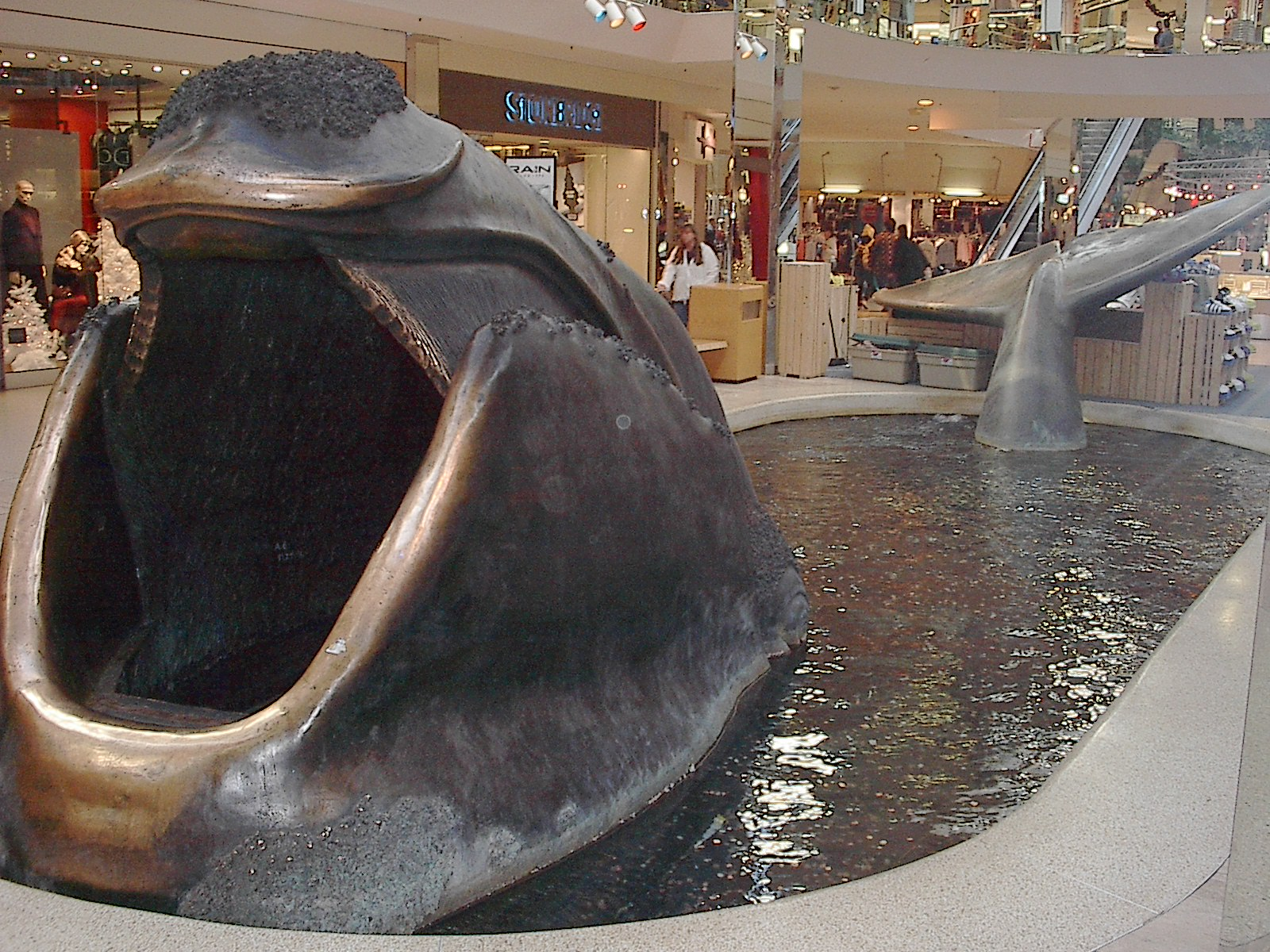
West Edmonton Mall's North Atlantic right whale bronze statue "Open Sea"

In the United States, this species is listed as endangered by the NMFS under the Endangered Species Act. It is also listed as depleted under the Marine Mammal Protection Act.

In Canada the species is federally protected under the Species at Risk Act (SARA). Since entanglement in floating gear accounted for 82% of documented right whale deaths in 2022, the Canadian Wildlife Federation has been providing ropeless equipment to snow crab fishers in and around the Gulf of St Lawrence.

On a global level, the Convention on the Conservation of Migratory Species of Wild Animals (CMS, or the "Bonn Convention") is a multilateral treaty specializing in the conservation of migratory species, their habitats and migration routes. CMS has listed the North Atlantic right whale on Appendix I, which identifies it as a migratory species threatened with extinction. This obligates member nations to strive towards strict protection of these animals, habitat conservation or restoration, mitigation of obstacles to migration, and control of other factors that might endanger them.

Additionally, CMS encourages concerted action among the range states of many Appendix I species. To that end, a small portion of the eastern Atlantic population's range is covered by the Agreement on the Conservation of Cetaceans in the Black Sea, Mediterranean Sea and Contiguous Atlantic Area (ACCOBAMS). The Atlantic area bounded on the west by a line running from Cape St. Vincent in southwest Portugal to Casablanca, Morocco, and on the east by the Strait of Gibraltar.

Another multilateral treaty, the Convention on International Trade in Endangered Species of Wild Fauna and Flora, (CITES, or the "Washington Convention"), also lists the North Atlantic right whale on its own Appendix I. Being so listed prohibits international trade (import or export) in specimens of this species or any derivative products (e.g. food or drug products, bones, trophies), except for scientific research and other exceptional cases with a permit specific to that specimen.

=== Litigation ===
On April 9, 2020, Judge James Boasberg issued an opinion finding that the National Marine Fisheries Service violated the Endangered Species Act when it issued a biological opinion in 2014 allowing for the accidental killings of North Atlantic right whales, of which only about 400 remained as of April 8, 2020; by the American lobster fishery, which consists of seven areas spanning the east coast from Maine to North Carolina.

== Whale watching ==
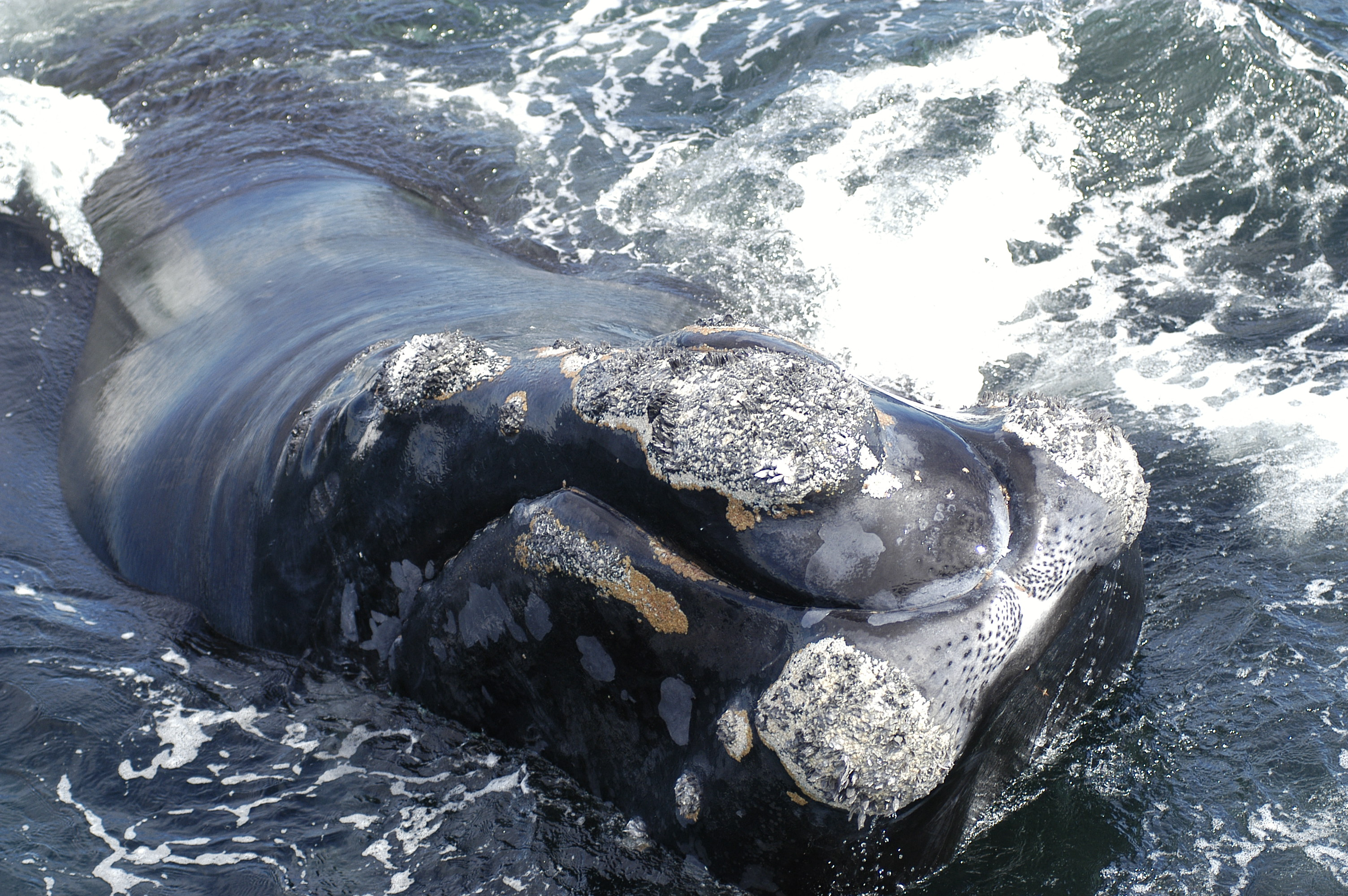
Curious whale lifting head, showing distinctive callosities to observers on boats.

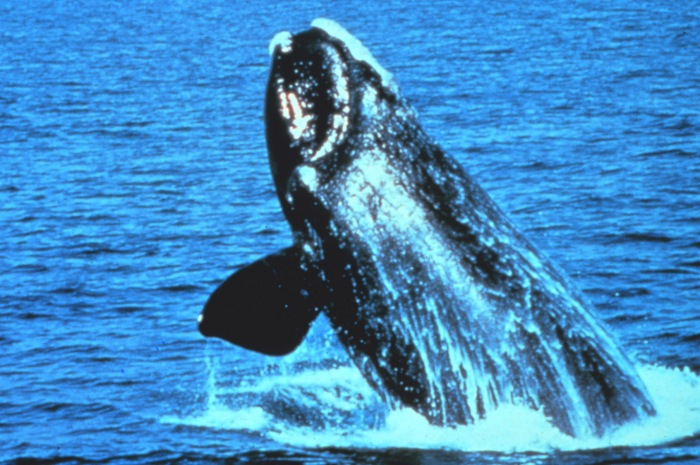
Breaching.

Either land based or organized whale watching activities are available along east coasts from Canada in north to Virginia, North Carolina, Georgia, Florida to south. Stellwagen Bank Sanctuary has also been designated for watching this species. Onlookers lucky enough can spot them from shores time to time on whales' migration seasons especially for feeding (vicinity to Cape Cod such as at Race Point and Brier Island), and breeding/calving (off Georgia to Florida coasts) when whales strongly approach shores or enters rivers or estuaries such as at Outer Banks, Pamlico Sound, Indian River Inlet, Cape Lookout, Virginia Beach, Virginia, Golden Isles of Georgia, beaches on Florida (e.g. most notably at Flagler, Jacksonville, St. Augustine, Ponte Vedra, Satellite, Crescent, and Cocoa, and any others like Ormond, New Smyrna, South Melbourne, Wrightsville, Vero), Boynton, and so on. There are some piers used for lookout points such as at Jacksonville and Wrightsville.

With their low profile on the water, right whales can be difficult to spot, so all fishermen and boaters transiting through potential right whale habitat should keep a sharp lookout. Boaters should be advised that NOAA Fisheries has a "500-yard rule", prohibiting anyone from approaching within 500 yards (1,500 ft; 460 m) of a North Atlantic right whale. The regulations include all boaters, fishing vessels (except commercial fishing vessel retrieving gear), kayakers, surfers, and paddleboarders, and agencies such as the United States Coast Guard and the Massachusetts Environmental Police have been authorized to enforce it.

Right whale sightings can be valuable to researchers, who recommend all sightings be reported. In Florida, the Marine Resources Council maintains a volunteer sighting network to receive sighting information from the public and verify sightings with trained volunteers.

Due to the species' status, as of 2014, there is no whale watching location in eastern and mid Atlantic, or oceanic islands used to observe right whales regularly. Among these, only off Iceland right whales have been encountered during watching tours (save for expeditions and land-based observations targeting for birds and other faunas), and several observations were made in Iceland during the 2000s.

== See also ==
- List of Georgia state symbols
- List of South Carolina state symbols
- List of mammals of Massachusetts (Right whale is the State Marine Animal)
- List of mammals of Georgia (U.S. state)
- List of marine mammal species
- List of cetaceans
- Moira Brown
