= Removal of Sunset Provision for vessel restrictions =

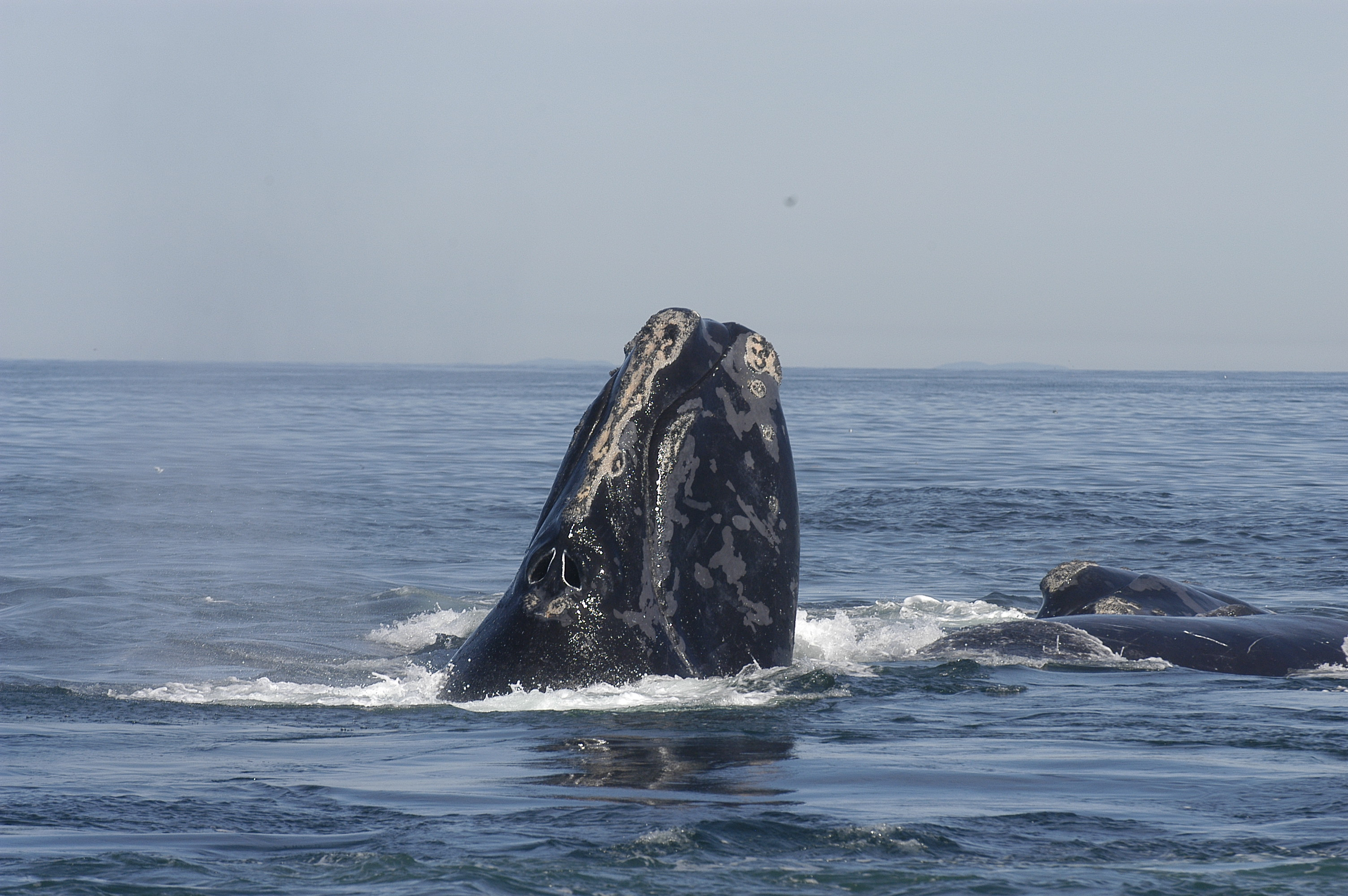
North Atlantic right whale breaching the surface

As of December 6, 2013, the National Marine Fisheries Service (NMFS) and National Oceanic and Atmospheric Administration (NOAA) have established a final rule in which eliminates sunset provision or the expiration date for regulations regarding vessels traveling in the Atlantic. To reduce fatal ship collisions, these required restrictions include speed limits of no more than 10-knots for vessels of 65 feet or greater in certain locations and at certain times of the year along the east coast of the U.S. Atlantic seaboard.

== History ==
The population of the North Atlantic right whale (Eubalaena glacialis) has declined since 1970 due to commercial whaling and heavy vessel traffic in the North Atlantic Ocean. Although commercial whaling has been contributing to the protection of the species since 1935, the population has failed to make a full recovery. With an average population of 400, the North Atlantic right whale is currently on the IUCN Red ListI, classified as an endangered species.

== Sunset Provision ==
In terms of public policy, the Sunset provision is a regulation or part of legislation that provides an automatic repeal of a law that has reached its specific expiration date. The ruling to eliminate the sunset provision regarding vessel speed restrictions was first proposed in June 2013. The National Marine Fisheries Service accepted comments from the public about measures that would be taken for assessing the long term costs and benefits of the rule to the endangered North Atlantic right whale population. The sunset provision was set to expire on December 9, 2013. Final ruling to remove the provision (implementing vessel speed restrictions in order to reduce the threat of collisions with North Atlantic right whales) went into effect on December 6, 2013.

== Science-based Marine Policy Decision ==
North Atlantic right whales are considered to be the most critically endangered mammals, with the populations continuously declining. Large whales have low rates of reproduction, in turn, creating low recovery rates. The life expectancy for a right whale is 60 years. In order for populations to grow, projections for the species show that a female would be required to give birth to an average of four calves in her lifetime. In most cases, half of the calves born are males, therefore, the survival rate of the remaining two females are given half the chance of survival. Anthropogenic activities are proving to be the lead cause of the North Atlantic right whales' inability to recover from population decline. The main causes of death to the species include ship collisions and entanglement in fishing gear. Most collisions appear to occur during peak feeding, calving, and migratory periods as they tend to spend more time on the surface at these times.
