= Vessel speed restrictions to reduce ship collisions with North Atlantic right whales =

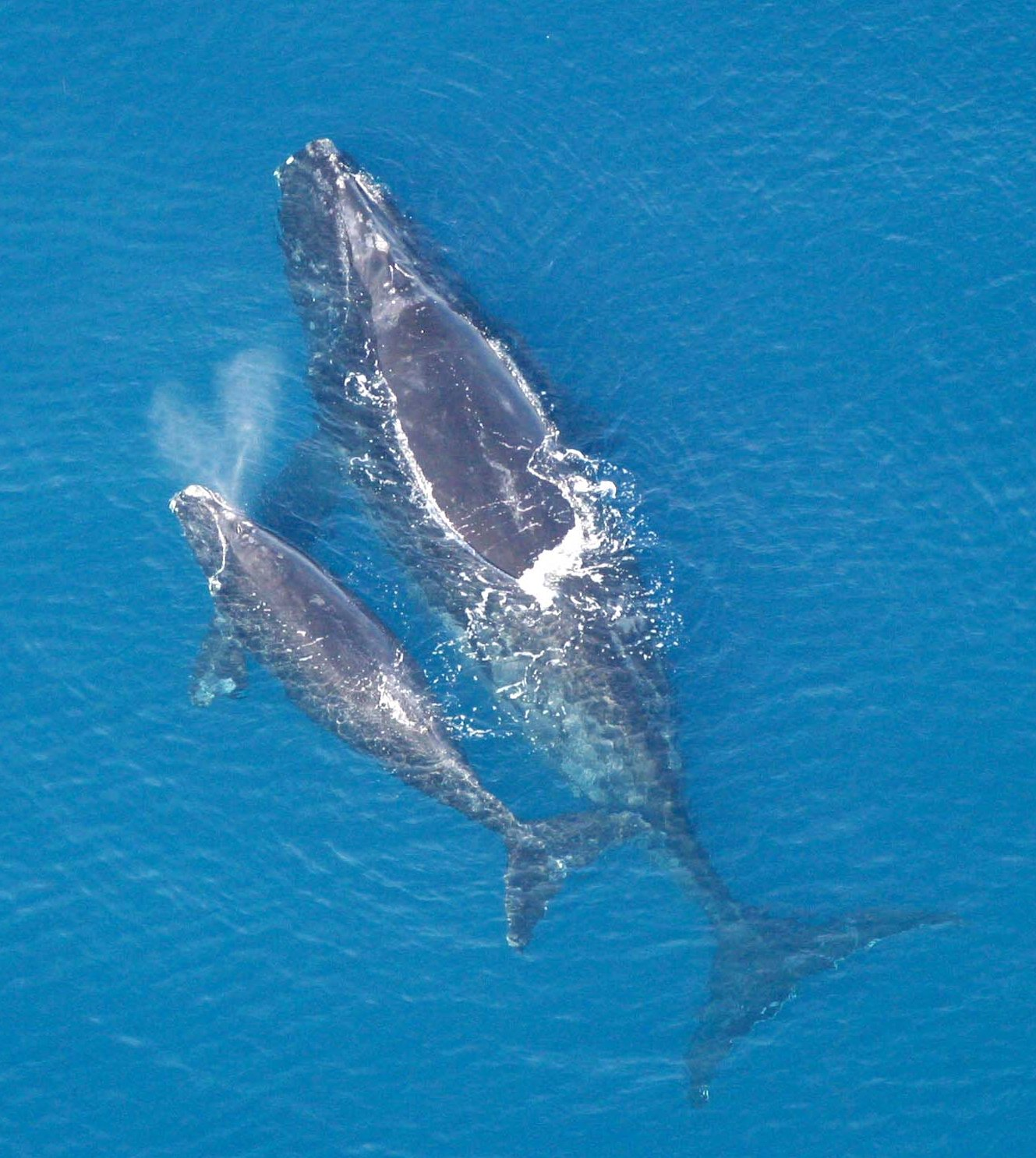
Eubalaena glacialis with calf

The National Marine Fisheries Service (NMFS) and the National Oceanic and Atmospheric Administration (NOAA) established a rule in 2008 to implement vessel speed restrictions of 10 knots or less on ships 65 ft (20 m) or longer in various locations along the East Coast of the United States. The purpose of the regulations was to reduce the probability of deaths and injuries to endangered North Atlantic right whales due to collisions with ships. The rule was enacted December 9, 2008.

== History ==
North Atlantic right whales are highly endangered. In the early 1900s, the population was reduced to only a few hundred whales as a result of commercial whaling. Although whales were protected from commercial whaling since 1935, the population still has not fully recovered. In 2011 the population of western North Atlantic right whales was estimated at about 465 whales. Despite recent small growth in population, the North Atlantic right whales remain critically endangered. The eastern North Atlantic right whales are nearly extinct.

It is difficult for the North Atlantic right whale to quickly increase its population due to its low reproduction level. Calves and juveniles have a high mortality rate. In fact, it is projected that a female may have to give birth more than four calves in order to replace themselves. The low reproduction level and small population makes the recovery of the North Atlantic right whale very difficult with even low levels of human-caused mortality.

== Threat of ship strikes ==
Human activities accounts for about one third of right whale mortalities. Mortalities caused by ships are one of the main threats right whales face. A collision with a vessel may result in fractured bones, crushed skulls, severed tail stocks, internal hemorrhaging, and deep propeller wounds. From 1971 to 2011, 91 North Atlantic right whale deaths occurred due to ship strikes, entanglements in (ghost) fishing nets, or unknown causes. Thirty-one of those deaths were attributed to ship strikes. However, based on data from other whale species, only 5-17% of strikes are detected, so the total number may be higher. North Atlantic right whales are more vulnerable to ship strikes than other whales because right whales spend more time in coastal areas at the surface of the ocean and do not exhibit vessel-avoidance behavior. In addition, majority of ship strike victims are females. Although it is uncertain why this is so, it is hypothesized that it is because pregnant females and females with calves spend more time at the surface where they are more vulnerable to ship strikes.

== Implementation and regulation of ruling ==
In October 2008 NMFS and NOAA implemented regulations to reduce the mortality of ship strikes to North Atlantic right whales. The rule would prevent ships 65 ft (20 m) or longer from traveling 10 knots or faster along specified locations. The sunset provision on this ruling, which was set to December 9, 2013, was later removed.
