= Moira Brown =

Canadian marine biologist

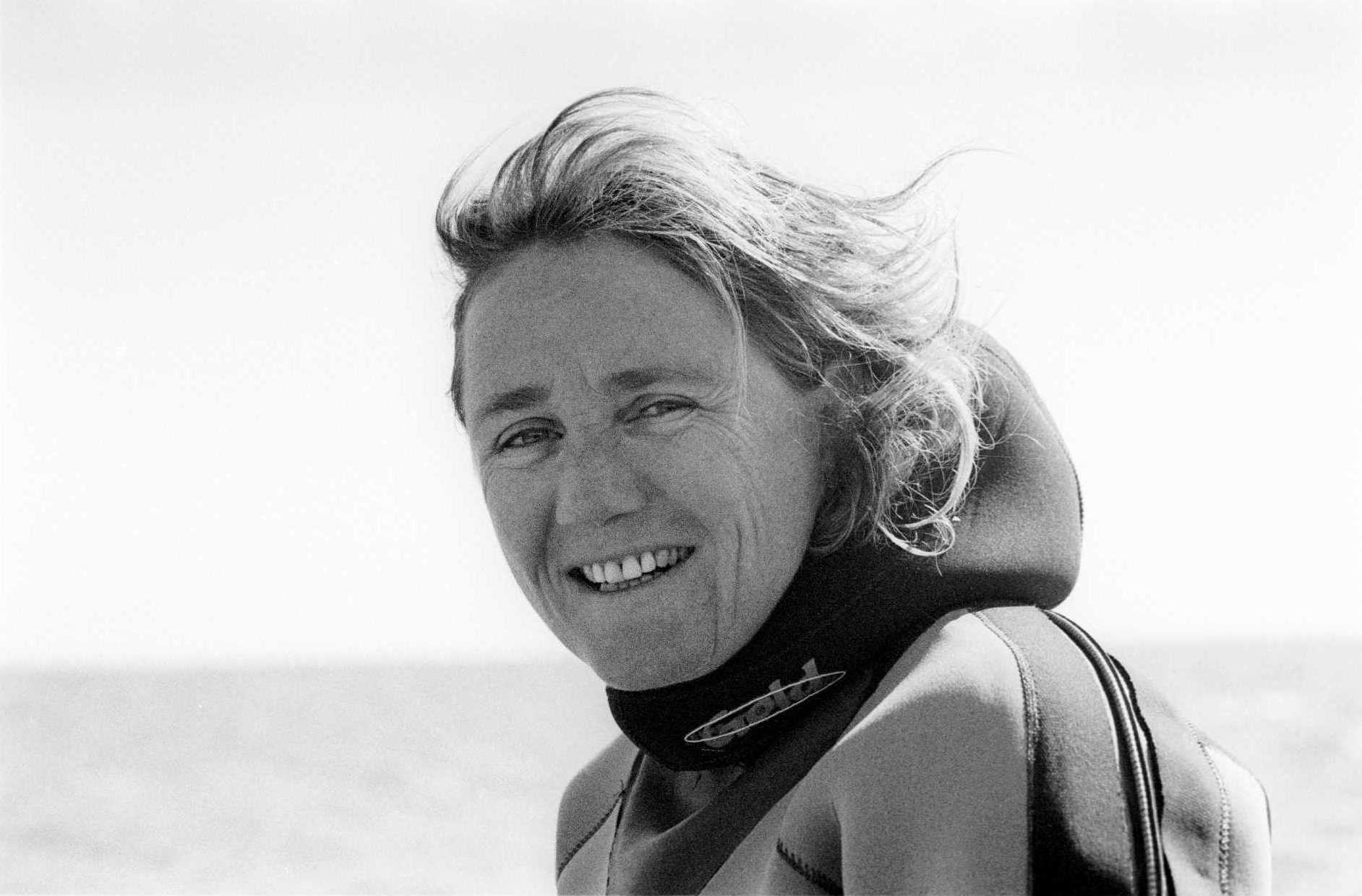
- Born: Montreal, Quebec
- Occupation: Marine Biologist
- Awards: Canadian Environment Award (2003); Gulf of Maine Visionary Award (2002)

Academic background
- Education: University of Guelph; McGill University

Academic work
- Discipline: Oceanography; Marine Biology
- Sub-discipline: North Atlantic Right Whales
- Institutions: Canadian Whale Institute

Moira Brown is a Canadian researcher of North Atlantic right whales. She is leading the initiative to convince the Government of Canada, shipping industry and scientists to address ship strikes and North Atlantic right whale mortality in the Bay of Fundy, Canada. Brown has conducted research on whales for more than 30 years.

== Early life and education ==
Brown was born in Montreal, Quebec and grew up in Lachine. She taught Physical Education Class for four years in schools in the West Island District of Montreal, Quebec. She then enrolled in McGill University in Montreal to study renewable resources and graduated with a Bachelor of Science degree.

== Career ==
Brown worked as a research assistant for Fisheries and Oceans Canada on a project about the history of whaling. In 1985 she started to work as a volunteer at the New England Aquarium, studying North Atlantic right whale population biology in the Bay of Fundy, and later in Cape Cod Bay. Her studies on right whale genetics commenced in 1988.

After working with and studying these whales for ten years, Moira returned to university to pursue a Doctorate degree from the University of Guelph in Ontario.

Brown worked at the College of the Atlantic in Bar Harbor, Maine, for three years and then became Director at the Center for Coastal Studies in Provincetown, Massachusetts, working for seven years on the conservation of marine mammals and their ecosystem.

After a five-year effort by Brown and her colleagues, the International Maritime Organization amended shipping lanes in 2003 to avoid an endangered marine species.

In 2004, Brown became a senior scientist at the New England Aquarium in Boston, Massachusetts, where she still conducts marine conservation work focused on diminishing the human-related threats to the right whale population in Canadian waters.

In 2016 she is Co-Chair of the North Atlantic Right Whale Recovery-Implementation Team. She is also a member of the Canadian Whale Institute.

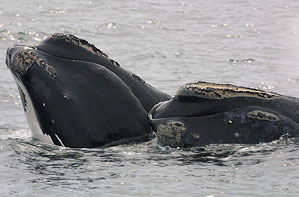
Two North Atlantic right whales

=== Photo Identification Catalogue ===
Photo identification of whales was first developed in the 1970s and is used extensively during modern whale studies. Each right whale has physical features that make it unique and distinguishable from the rest. The natural markings of each whale are photographed, and the information is compiled to a computer database.

The North Atlantic Right Whale Catalogue at the New England Aquarium was started by Scott Kraus in 1990. It contains information related to over 30,000 whale sightings of over 500 individual whales since 1935. Brown is one of a number of scientists who have contributed to the database.

Scientists and researchers used this information to estimate population numbers: in 2007, the right whale population was estimated to be at 400 whales. They can determine when and where an individual whale has traveled throughout its lifetime, and monitor whale population demographics, reproductive efforts, mortality, behavior, migration patterns, and occurrence rates of human-caused scarring. Results gathered from this research can then be used to discover species-wide problems and implement recovery strategies, such as the Bay of Fundy Traffic Separation Scheme, enforced in 2003.

=== Natural Resources DNA Profiling and Forensic Centre ===
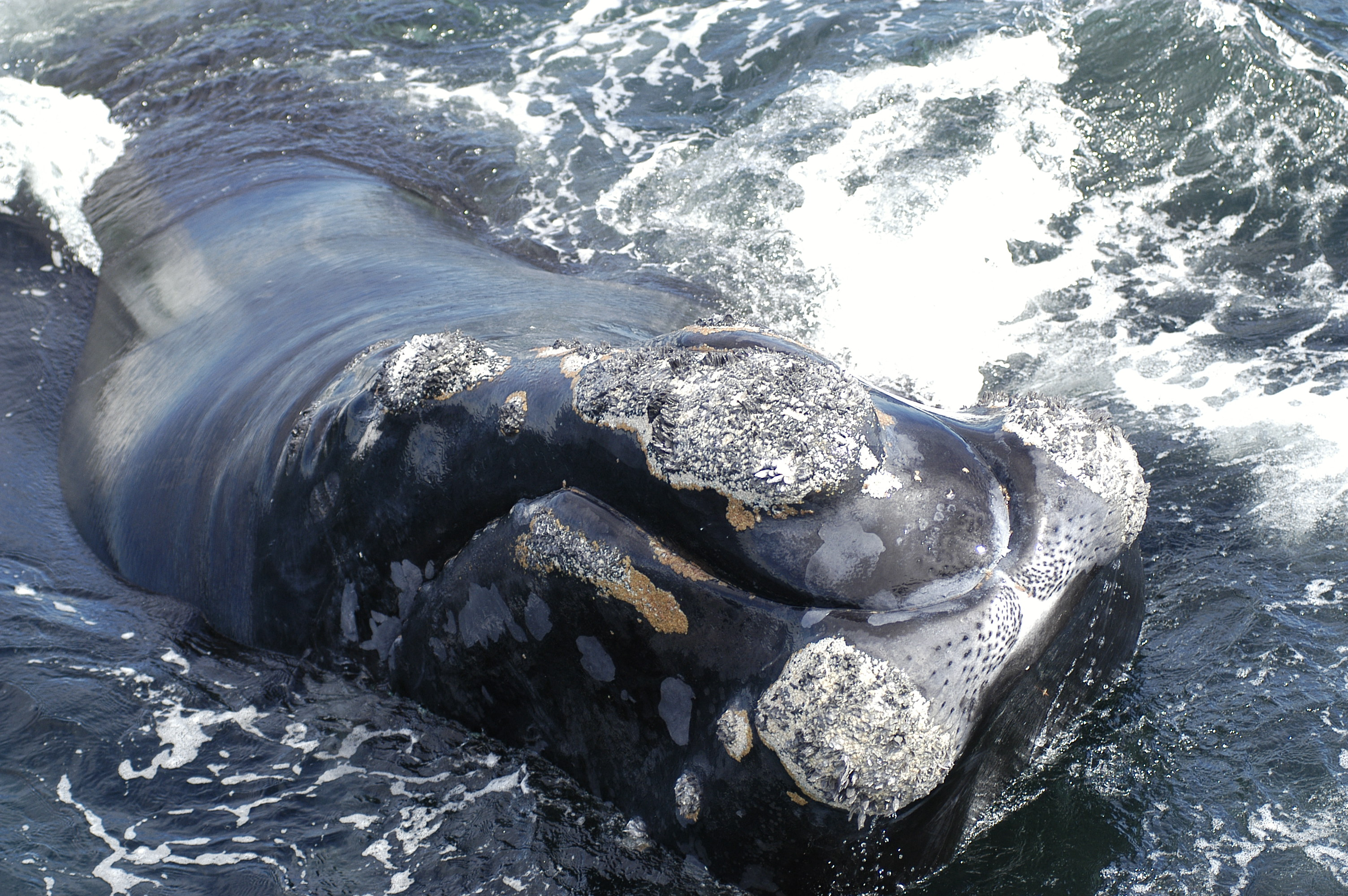
North Atlantic right whale surfacing

The Natural Resources DNA Profiling and Forensic Centre in Canada has introduced high-resolution genetic profiling for North Atlantic right whale study. Researchers study the declining population of the endangered North Atlantic right whale through both historical and contemporary analysis.

Brown is a member of a team of researchers who are trying to find out why the number of right whales population has so drastically declined. One theory was that Basque whaling in the 16th and 17th centuries in the Gulf of Saint Lawrence led to the demise. At Red Bay, Newfoundland and Labrador, in 1978, during an investigation of whaling centres of the Strait of Belle Isle (Gulf of St. Lawrence), whale bones were found near a Basque galleon that sank in 1565. Researchers from Parks Canada and the Canadian Museum of Nature analysed the morphology and genetics the bones, but after comparing them with North Atlantic whale bone DNA, they concluded that the Basques primarily hunted bowhead whales, not right whales.

To study the genetics of contemporary whales, Brown extracts North Atlantic right whale bone DNA by using a Crossbow and biopsy tip to collect whale skin samples. She, works with a team of geneticists at Trent University under the leadership of Bradley White to analyze and record these samples to create a right whale "family tree". The data collected from this research can be used to study right whale reproductive biology and the factors that contribute to their reproductive success.

== Awards ==
By implementing one of the most important marine mammal protection measures in Canada, Brown has been recognized with the following awards:

- Gulf of Maine Visionary Award] (2002)
- Canadian Environment Award (2003)
- International Fund for Animal Welfare Lifetime Achievement Award (2006)

== Selected Publications ==
- Durette-Morin, D., Davies, K.T.A., Johnson, H.D., Brown, M.W., Moors-Murphy, H., Martin, B. and Taggart, C.T. (2019), Passive acoustic monitoring predicts daily variation in North Atlantic right whale presence and relative abundance in Roseway Basin, Canada. Mar Mam Sci, 35: 1280-1303. https://doi.org/10.1111/mms.12602
- Davies, K. T. A. et al. Variation in North Atlantic right whale Eubalaena glacialis occurrence in the Bay of Fundy, Canada, over three decades. Endangered Species Research 39, 159-171 (2019).
- Mayo CA, Ganley L, Hudak CA, et al. Distribution, demography, and behavior of North Atlantic right whales (Eubalaena glacialis) in Cape Cod Bay, Massachusetts, 1998–2013. Marine mammal science. 2018;34(4):979-996. doi:10.1111/mms.12511
- Reimer J, Gravel C, Brown MW, Taggart CT. Mitigating vessel strikes: The problem of the peripatetic whales and the peripatetic fleet. Marine policy. 2016;68:91-99. doi:10.1016/j.marpol.2016.02.017
