= Unusual mortality event =

Unexpected deaths of marine mammals

An unusual mortality event (UME) is a term in United States environmental law that refers to a set of strandings, morbidities, or mortalities of marine mammals that are significant, unexpected, and demanding of an immediate response. While the term is only officially defined in a statute in the US, it has been employed unofficially by cetacean conservation agencies and organizations internationally as well.

== In the United States ==
=== Definition and criteria ===
The United States Marine Mammal Protection Act (MMPA) defines an Unusual Mortality Event (UME) as "a stranding event that is unexpected, involves a significant die-off of any marine mammal population, and demands immediate response." Additionally, the law sets out seven criteria that may make a mortality event "unusual." These are:

1. "A marked increase in the magnitude or a marked change in the nature of morbidity, mortality, or strandings when compared with prior records."
2. "A temporal change in morbidity, mortality, or strandings is occurring."
3. "A spatial change in morbidity, mortality, or strandings is occurring."
4. "The species, age, or sex composition of the affected animals is different than that of animals that are normally affected."
5. "Affected animals exhibit similar or unusual pathologic findings, behavior patterns, clinical signs, or general physical condition (e.g., blubber thickness)."
6. "Potentially significant morbidity, mortality, or stranding is observed in species, stocks, or populations that are particularly vulnerable (e.g., listed as depleted, threatened, or endangered or declining). For example, stranding of three or four right whales may be cause for great concern whereas stranding of a similar number of fin whales may not."
7. "Morbidity is observed concurrent with or as part of an unexplained continual decline of a marine mammal population, stock, or species."

The national Working Group on Marine Mammal Unusual Mortality Events, consisting of a group of marine mammal health experts, assesses mortality events, and if it finds that one meets one or more of these criteria, it recommends that NOAA's Assistant Administrator for Fisheries declare a UME.

=== Past and present examples ===
The NOAA has declared 72 marine mammal UMEs since 1991. Of these, 5 remained open as of November 2023:

1. UME declared 2017 for humpback whales in the Atlantic due to vessel strikes.
2. UME declared 2017 for North Atlantic right whales in the Atlantic (US and Canada) due to vessel strikes and rope entanglements.
3. UME declared 2019 for gray whales in the Pacific due to undetermined causes.
4. UME declared 2021 for manatees in the Atlantic (Florida) due to malnutrition resulting from forage changes.
5. UME declared 2022 for harbor and grey seals in the Atlantic due to infectious disease.

== Internationally ==
Marine mammal mortality events fitting the criteria of a UME are not confined to waters under U.S. jurisdiction. While the concept of a UME is not officially defined in the laws of any other countries, there have been several examples of European management agencies or organizations borrowing the term to define an ongoing mortality event under their purview.

In 2013, the executive officer of the Irish Whale and Dolphin Group published an essay on the group's website asking, "Are we Experiencing an Unusual Mortality Event (UME) in Ireland?" The concerns centered around increased strandings of various species of dolphins, paralleling a declared UME relating to bottlenose dolphins in the U.S. at the time.

A 2018 Advisory Committee meeting of ASCOBANS (a multilateral agreement to protect small cetaceans in the Baltic, Irish, and North Seas as well as the northeast Atlantic Ocean) included a presentation that affirmed the existence of a UME relating to beaked whales in the UK and Ireland.

A best practices document jointly published by ASCOBANS and ACCOBAMS (a similar agreement covering the Black Sea, Mediterranean Sea, and contiguous Atlantic area west of the Straits of Gibraltar) included the U.S. definition of UME more or less verbatim.
