= Ship collision =

When a ship crash into something such as another ship

Ship collision is a type of maritime incident, a violent encounter involving moving ships. Ship collisions are of particular importance in marine accidents. Some reasons for the latter are:

- The loss of human life.
- The environmental impact of oil spills, especially where large tanker ships are involved.
- Financial consequences to local communities close to the accident.
- The financial consequences to shipowners, due to ship loss or penalties.
- Damage to coastal or off-shore infrastructure, for example collision with bridges.

As sea lanes are getting more congested and ship speeds higher, there is a significant possibility that a ship may experience an important accident during her lifetime. Higher speeds may cause larger operational loads, like slamming, or excessively severe loads, for example during a collision. Denser sea routes increase the probability of an accident—in particular a collision—involving ships or ships and shore or offshore structures.

Almost 27% of ship collisions occur near coasts and 22% at narrow channels. This is usually due to disregarding best practices and regulations by navigation officers and masters. In addition, the IMO guidelines for voyage planning are not always followed. Violations are usually associated with not maintaining a safe speed, overtaking, or miscommunication with the pilot.

== Collisions with wildlife ==
Large whales and species such as sea turtles or whale sharks often suffer lethal wounds from collisions with ships (vessel strikes). There are programs in development and implementation phases aimed at reducing vessel speed in critical waterways, both voluntarily and by regulation, which aim to protect endangered whales.

== See also ==
- Vessel speed restrictions to reduce ship collisions with North Atlantic right whales
- Ramming
- List of ships sunk by icebergs

== Sources ==
- Healy, Nicholas J.; Sweeney, Joseph C. (July–October 1991). "Basic Principles of the Law of Collision". Journal of Maritime Law and Commerce. 22 (3): 359–404.
