= Marine Mammal Protection Act =

Act of the United States Congress in 1972

- Long title: An Act to protect marine mammals; to establish a Marine Mammal Commission; and for other purposes.
- Enacted by: the 92nd United States Congress
- Effective: December 21, 1972

Citations
- Public law: 92-522
- Statutes at Large: 86 Stat. 1027

Codification
- Titles amended: 16 U.S.C.: Conservation
- U.S.C. sections created: 16 U.S.C. ch. 31 §§ 1361–1362, 1371-1389, 1401-1407, 1411-1418, 1421-1421h, 1423-1423h

Legislative history
- Introduced in the House as H.R. 10420 by Edward Garmatz (D–MD) on December 4, 1971; Committee consideration by House Merchant Marine and Fisheries; Passed the House on March 9, 1972 (362-10); Passed the Senate on July 26, 1972 (88-2, in lieu of S. 2871); Reported by the joint conference committee on August 1, 1972; agreed to by the House on October 10, 1972 (Agreed) and by the Senate on October 11, 1972 (Agreed); Signed into law by President Richard Nixon on October 21, 1972

United States Supreme Court cases
- Winter v. Natural Resources Defense Council, 555 U.S. 7 (2008)

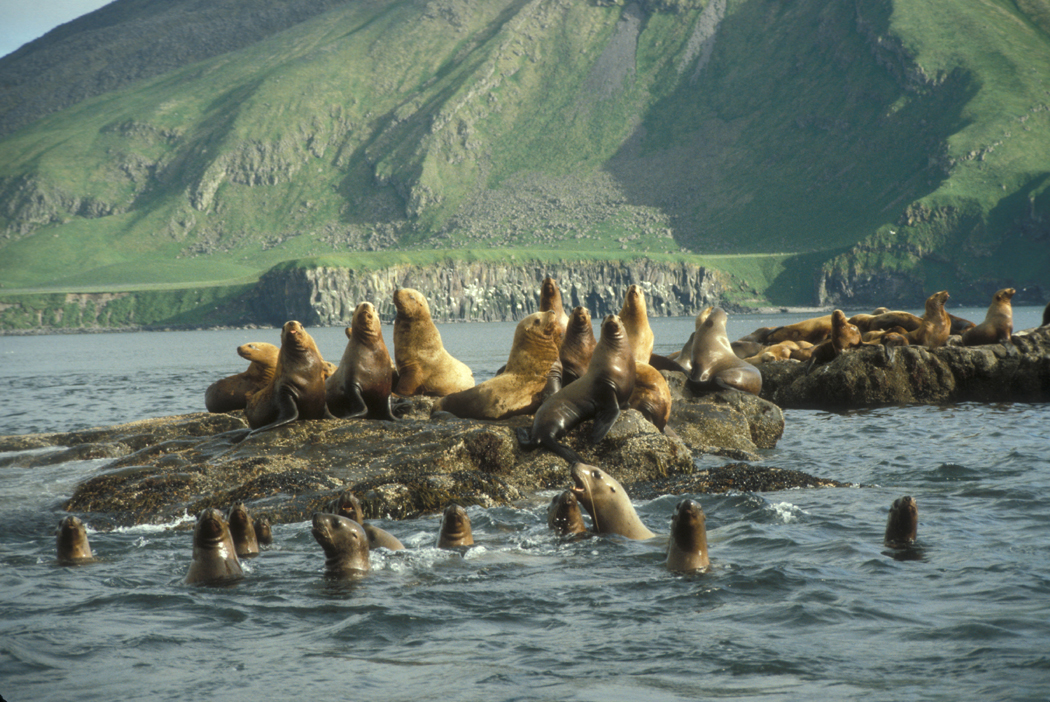
One species of marine mammal: the Steller sea lion - this haul rests on rocks located on Amak Island.

The Marine Mammal Protection Act (MMPA) was the first act of the United States Congress to call specifically for an ecosystem approach to wildlife management.

== Authority ==
MMPA was signed into law on October 21, 1972, by President Richard Nixon and took effect 60 days later on December 21, 1972. It prohibits the "taking" of marine mammals, and enacts a moratorium on the import, export, and sale of any marine mammal, along with any marine mammal part or product within the United States. The Act defines "take" as "the act of hunting, killing, capture, and/or harassment of any marine mammal; or, the attempt at such." The MMPA defines harassment as "any act of pursuit, torment or annoyance which has the potential to either: a. injure a marine mammal in the wild, or b. disturb a marine mammal by causing disruption of behavioral patterns, which includes, but is not limited to, migration, breathing, nursing, breeding, feeding, or sheltering." The MMPA provides for enforcement of its prohibitions, and for the issuance of regulations to implement its legislative goals.

Authority to manage the MMPA was divided between the Secretary of the Interior through the U.S. Fish and Wildlife Service (Service), and the Secretary of Commerce, which is delegated to the National Oceanic and Atmospheric Administration (NOAA). Subsequently, a third federal agency, the Marine Mammal Commission (MMC), was established to review existing policies and make recommendations to the Service and the NOAA better implement the MMPA. Coordination between these three federal agencies is necessary in order to provide the best management practices for marine mammals.

Under the MMPA, the Service is responsible for ensuring the protection of sea otters and marine otters, walruses, polar bears, three species of manatees, and dugongs. NOAA was given responsibility to conserve and manage pinnipeds including seals and sea lions and cetaceans such as whales and dolphins.

=== NOAA Responsibilities ===
The NOAA enforces the Marine Mammal Protection Act through the implementation and enforcement of various policies and regulations to properly manage marine mammal populations. The NOAA does this through the identification of violations of the MMPA, coordinating efforts to aid stranded and entangled mammals, and conduct proper rehabilitation and release of injured marine mammals. The NOAA is also responsible for providing stock assessment reports on marine mammals under their jurisdiction which includes whales, dolphins, porpoises, seals, and sea lions. Stock assessment reports serve to identify trends in marine mammal populations, identify potential threats to said population, and whether current conservation efforts are effective and if adjustments need to be made to ensure effective enforcement of the MMPA.

The specific information that is included in all stock assessments are the geographic range of the stock being studied, current trends and productivity rates for the stock, potential biological removal levels which is defined under the MMPA as "the maximum number of animals, not including natural mortalities, that may be removed from a marine mammal stock while allowing that stock to reach or maintain its optimum sustainable population", an estimation of mortality and injury rate caused by humans, potential threats to conservation efforts and current status of the stock and a minimum population estimation.

These stock assessments are created through research conducted by programs at NOAA research science centers which are located in Hawaii, Massachusetts, Alaska, Florida, Washington, and California. Research contributions are also made by researchers not affiliated with the previously mentioned programs as well.

=== Marine Mammal Commission Responsibilities ===
The Marine Mammal Commission (MMC) was created in 1972 through the MMPA to serve as an organization that provides oversight over conservation policies, regulations and programs being carried out to ensure they are carried out effectively by the federal agencies responsible for them. Their responsibilities also include ensuring the United States adhere to international agreements that relate to marine mammal conservation "including, but not limited to, the International Convention for the Regulation of Whaling, the Whaling Convention Act of 1949, the Interim Convention on the Conservation of North Pacific Fur Seals, and the Fur Seal Act of 1966." The MMC is also responsible for the review of the research programs conducted for the purpose of the MMPA as well as authorizing permits for the purpose of research, conservation or public display. If the MMC finds that the current conservation efforts are shown to be ineffective in protecting species identified under the MMPA, they are responsible for effectively communicating with federal officials such as the Secretaries of State, Commerce or the Interior the recommended measures needed to be taken to ensure the effectiveness of the MMPA and the protection of marine mammals under this act. These recommendations can come in the form of implementation of international agreements, revisions to the endangered and threatened species list as deemed appropriate under the Endangered Species Act of 1973, and provisions that may need to be made to the MMPA.

=== U.S. Fish and Wildlife Services Responsibilities ===
The U.S. Fish and Wildlife Services are responsible for managing the take through the use of permits and other authorization as well as financially supporting efforts to help marine mammals that fall victim to stranding and relevant research efforts. Similar to the NOAA, the U.S. Fish and Wildlife Services conduct stock assessments of marine mammal populations under their jurisdiction which include walrus, manatees, sea otters, and polar bears. They are also responsible for the creation and implementation of conservation plans which often occur in collaboration with industries which can potentially impact marine mammal populations of particular concern.

== Marine mammal permits and international coordination ==
The MMPA prohibits the take and exploitation of any marine mammal without appropriate authorization, which may only be given by the Service. Permits may be issued for scientific research, public display, and the importation/exportation of marine mammal parts and products upon determination by the Service that the issuance is consistent with the MMPA's regulations. The two types of permits issued by the National Marine Fisheries Service's Office of Protected Resources are incidental and directed. Incidental permits, which allow for some unintentional taking of small numbers of marine mammal, are granted to U.S. citizens who engage in a specified activity other than commercial fishing in a specified geographic area. Directed permits are required for any proposed marine mammal scientific research activity that involves taking marine mammals.

Applications for such permits are reviewed and issued the Service's Division of Management Authority, through the International Affairs office. This office also houses the Division of International Conservation, which is directly responsible for coordinating international activities for marine mammal species found in both U.S. and International waters, or are absent from U.S. waters. Marine mammal species inhabiting both U.S. and International waters include the West Indian manatee, sea otter, polar bear, and Pacific walrus. Species not present in U.S. waters include the West African and Amazonian manatee, dugong, Atlantic walrus, and marine otter.

== Marine mammal conservation in the field ==
In efforts to conserve and manage marine mammal species, the Service has appointed field staff dedicated to working with partners to conduct population censuses, assess population health, develop and implement conservation plans, promulgate regulations, and create cooperative relationships internationally.

Various Marine Mammal Management offices are located on either coast. The Service's Marine Mammal Management office in Anchorage, Alaska is responsible for the management and conservation of polar bears, Pacific walruses, and northern sea otters in Alaska. Northern sea otters present in Washington state are managed by the Western Washington Field Office, while southern sea otters residing in California are managed by the Ventura Field Office. West Indian manatee populations extend from Texas to Rhode Island, and are also present in the Caribbean Sea; however, this species is most prevalent near Florida (the Florida subspecies) and Puerto Rico (the Antillean subspecies). The Service's Jacksonville Field Office manages the Florida manatee, while the Boqueron Field Office manages the Antillean manatee.

The polar bear, southern sea otter, marine otter, all three species of manatees, and the dugong are also concurrently listed under the Endangered Species Act (ESA).

Raw and unworked walrus ivory and bones from Alaska are exported to the Indonesian island of Bali where local artisans carve them into North American motives (salmon, wolves, cowboys). Research by a team led by EcoVerde Global Consulting showed that these items are then re-exported to the USA circumventing the US Marine Mammal Act

== Amendments ==
Amendments enacted in 1981 established conditions for permits to be granted to take marine mammals "incidentally" in the course of commercial fishing. In addition, the amendments provided additional conditions and procedures for transferring management authority to the States, and authorized appropriations through FY 1984.

Policies created in 1982

- Some marine mammal species or stocks may be in danger of extinction or depletion as a result of human activities.
- These species or stocks must not be permitted to fall below their optimum sustainable population level (depleted)
- Measures should be taken to replenish these species or stocks
- There is inadequate knowledge of the ecology and population dynamics
- Marine mammals have proven to be resources of great international significance.

The 1984 amendments established conditions to be satisfied as a basis for importing fish and fish products from nations engaged in harvesting yellowfin tuna with purse seines and other commercial fishing technology, as well as authorized appropriations for agency activities through FY 1988.

Amended in 1988

- The establishment of conditions and procedures for the Secretaries of Commerce and Interior to review the status of populations to determine if they should be listed as "depleted" (below optimal, sustainable population numbers or listed as threatened or endangered);
- The preparation of conservation plans for any species listed as depleted, including a requirement that such plans be modeled after recovery plans developed pursuant to the Endangered Species Act;
- The listing of conditions under which permits may be issued to take marine mammals for the protection and welfare of the animals, including importation, public display, scientific research, and enhancing the survival or recovery of a species; and
- A reward system authorizing the Secretary of the Treasury to pay up to $2,500 for information leading to convictions was enacted in under Section 106(c).

Amended in 1994

- Added Section 119 to authorize cooperative co-management agreements with Alaska Native organizations, alongside establishing Section 117 Stock Assessment Reports and the Section 118 commercial fishing incidental take regime.
- A program to authorize and control the taking of marine mammals incidental to commercial fishing operations;
- Preparation of stock assessments for all marine mammal stocks in waters under U.S. jurisdiction; and
- Studies of pinniped-fishery interactions.

2018 Lethal Removal Amendment (Colombia River)

Congress passed the Endangered Salmon and Fisheries Predation Prevention Act (Pub. L. 115-329), amending Section 120 to grant Pacific Northwest state wildlife agencies and tribes streamlined permits to lethally remove California and Steller sea lions preying on endangered salmon and steelhead runs.

2022 NDAA Ocean Conservation Provisions

Enacted as part of the FY 2023 National Defense Authorization Act (Pub. L. 117-263), adding Sections 1390–1393 to Title 16. These provisions authorized grant programs to reduce vessel strike mortalities, monitor underwater ocean noise, and fund a real-time "Cetacean Desk" pilot program in Puget Sound.

2025–2026 Global Seafood Import Comparability Rule

Long-dormant import provisions under Section 101(a)(2) reached full implementation. NOAA evaluated roughly 2,500 fisheries across 135 nations, barring seafood imports into the United States from foreign commercial fisheries that fail to prove bycatch protections equivalent to US standards.

== Co-management with Indigenous communities ==
Under the MMPA amended in 1994, in Section 119, NMFS and FWS was authorized to form the cooperative agreements (co-management plan) with Alaska Native Organizations (ANOs). This allows indigenous tribal government can engage in their territorial marine mammal protection and subsistence taking issues through individual co-management agreements which can be established with NOAA, USFWS, MMC, or other MMPA-affiliated agencies. Co-management is viewed as the practice of indigenous sovereignty and self-determination. Co-management under Section 119 includes the following activities:

- Collecting and analyzing data on marine mammal populations
- Monitoring the subsistence harvest of marine mammals
- Participating in marine mammal research conducted by federal and state governments, academic institutions, and private organizations; and,
- Developing co-management structures with federal and state agencies.

Alaska Nanuuq Commission (ANC) represents tribes for polar bears management with USFWS. In this partnership, the subsistence take of polar bear is legal according to MMPA, yet the prohibition is placed on taking females with cubs and harassment. Along with the co-management, Alaska Scientific Review Group is set up, with indigenous entities involved, to advise stock assessment and revise method for assessment.

Alaska Beluga Whale Committee (ABWC) was founded in 1988 to manage beluga subsistence hunting in Alaska. After the MMPA amended, ABWC starts to develop a co-management plan with National Marine Fisheries Service (NMFS) aiming to become an "umbrella organization concerned with statewide, national and international affairs." With the founding from NMFS, ABWC focus on facilitating scientific communication for the public, harvest monitoring, beluga tracking, aerial survey, genetics-based stock studies. The regional groups of ABWC are designate to "develop local management plans, hunting guide-lines and means of enforcement."

== Effectiveness ==
The Marine Mammal Protection Act has conservation benefits beyond US boundaries. The Act requires imported fisheries products to minimize incidental mortality and severe injury of marine mammals aligning to the US domestic standards. Yet it is difficult to expect this comparability from all exporting countries due to lack of fisheries records on bycatches and standardized protective measures which is causing unintentional harms.

The Act emphasizes the recovery and prevention of the depletion of strategic marine mammal stocks. Under Section 118, Take Reduction Plan aims within six months of implementation to reduce incidental mortality and severe injury from fishery and approach zero mortality rate in five years. The Plan includes:

- Review of the final stock assessment report for each marine mammal addressed by the Plan and any substantial new information.
- Estimate of the total number and, if possible, age and gender, of animals from the stock that is incidentally killed or seriously injured each year during the course of commercial fishing operations, by fishery.
- Recommended regulatory or voluntary measures for the reduction of incidental mortality and serious injury.
- Recommended dates for achieving the specific objectives of the plan.

The plan is developed with a team involving representatives from fishing industry, management councils, governmental agencies, scientific community, and conservation organization. The consensus from the representatives is then submitted to NOAA for review then through the public comment. As the Plan is finalized, NOAA has the duty to monitor its implementation with the team.

Yet, the Plans are uneven or unstandardized in practice to meet its statutory requirement. Successful plans are often based upon mandated, quantitative metrics, and consistent monitoring programs.

== Findings ==
Congress found that certain species and population stocks of marine mammals are, or may be, in danger of extinction or depletion as a result of human activities; these mammals should not be permitted to diminish below their optimum sustainable population; measures should be taken immediately to replenish any of these mammals that have diminished below that level, and efforts should be made to protect essential habitats; there is inadequate knowledge of the ecology and population dynamics of these mammals; negotiations should be undertaken immediately to encourage international arrangements for research and conservation of these mammals.

Congress declared that marine mammals are resources of great international significance (aesthetic, recreational and economic), and should be protected and encouraged to develop to the greatest extent feasible commensurate with sound policies of resource management. The primary management objective should be to maintain the health and stability of the marine ecosystem. The goal is to obtain an optimum sustainable population within the carrying capacity of the habitat.

== See also ==
- Endangered Species Act
- National Oceanic and Atmospheric Administration
- Society for Animal Protective Legislation
- Tuna-Dolphin GATT Case (I and II)
- Unusual mortality event
