= Whaling in New Zealand =

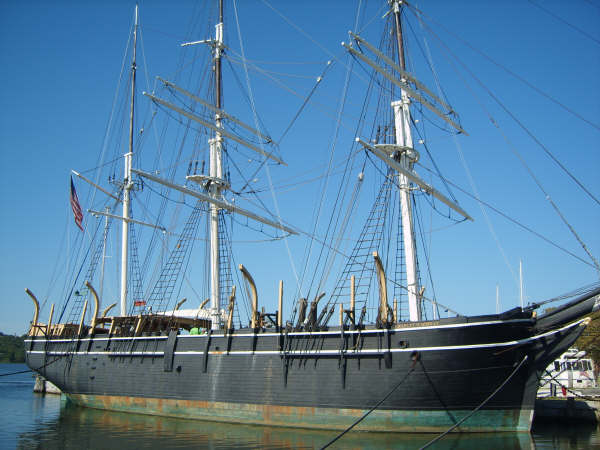
A preserved whaling ship which frequented New Zealand waters, the Charles W. Morgan

Commercial whaling in New Zealand waters began late in the 18th century and continued until 1965. It was a major economic activity for Europeans in New Zealand in the first four decades of the 19th century. Nineteenth-century whaling was based on hunting the southern right whale and the sperm whale and 20th-century whaling concentrated on the humpback whale.

There is now an established industry for whale watching based in the South Island town of Kaikōura and at other ports in New Zealand.

== History ==
The Māori, who were the first to settle in New Zealand, appear to have hunted whales rarely, but did eat stranded whales.

The earliest association of whaling with New Zealand is from December 1791, when the whaleship William and Ann called in at Doubtless Bay during a whaling voyage in the Pacific. It is not recorded if any whales were actually caught by the vessel in New Zealand waters. The Britannia arrived about the same time. Both were whalers that had chartered to carry convicts on the outward voyage from Britain and land them at Sydney before going whaling.

In the early 19th century, Kororāreka (now called Russell) in the Bay of Islands was an important port of call for whaling and sealing ships, and developed a wild reputation being called the Hellhole of the Pacific by Charles Darwin who did not like his time in New Zealand. His opinion reflected that of many of the early Christian missionaries. This behaviour was not just confined to the Bay of Islands. Missionary John Brumby in Marlborough in 1838, found the whalers to be "rogues and outlaws unrestrained by any law". Other contemporary observers had differing views. In 1839, Edward Wakefield, who later became a member of parliament in Britain, described shore whalers as having a dark side to their character but they were "frank and hospitable". They were intrepid with boundless resolution and great powers to endure hardship. He pays tribute to their hospitality to casual visitors and noted they were in stable relationships with Māori women, such as Te Wai Nahi of Te Atiawa, with whom they raised large families. His sentiments are echoed by his uncle, Colonel William, who was no advocate of working men. Other early whaling ships were the Foxhound, a London whaler, in 1827 and the Waterloo, which operated between Cloudy Bay and Sydney from 1829, taking 3 cargoes of whale oil per year and returning from Port Jackson with supplies and trade goods to exchange for flax.

The industry drew whalers to New Zealand from a diverse range of backgrounds encompassing not just the British Isles but also Indigenous peoples of the Americas, Pacific Islanders and Indigenous Australians. By the 1830s most whaling, apart from American ships, was shore-based in contrast to operations in the Atlantic and northern Pacific. They required processing the whale carcasses on land, with mixed crews of Māori and European sailors involved.

In the first half of the 19th century, almost a hundred small shore stations were established – in the South Island at Te Awaiti and Preservation Inlet and later at Stewart Island, Otago, Timaru and Kaikōura and Cloudy Bay. On Banks Peninsula the first shore was at Little Port Cooper in 1836 and by 1842 there were a total of five stations, including Oashore Bay, Ikoraki and Peraki. North of Wellington, there were three whaling stations at Porirua, and five on Kapiti Island. Further north there were also shore stations at New Plymouth and Great Barrier Island. However, by 1840 the whale numbers had declined to the point that little money was to be made, and in 1844 the last of the early onshore stations closed.

Still, Captain Nye of the barque Mount Wollaston reported in 1879 that the northern whales averaged 10 lb of whale bone to each barrel of oil, and at that time were the most profitable whales caught. The following table presents the average yield of oil and bone to the northern and southern whale:

Species	Barrels of whale oil	Pounds of whale bone
Northern right whale	125	1500
Southern right whale	75	600
Arctic whale	90	1450

A later shore station, Perano's of Tory Channel, Cook Strait caught 4200 whales (mainly humpback) between 1911 and 1964. In the 1960s, facing a ban by the International Whaling Commission on catching humpback whales in the southern hemisphere, the Perano station switched to sperm whales, and over 1963–64 took 248 between Cook Strait and Kaikōura. The last whale taken by a New Zealand commercial whaling vessel in New Zealand waters was a male sperm whale killed in 1964, offshore from Kaikōura. The closure of Perano Whaling Station was announced on 4 January 1965.

== Conservation ==
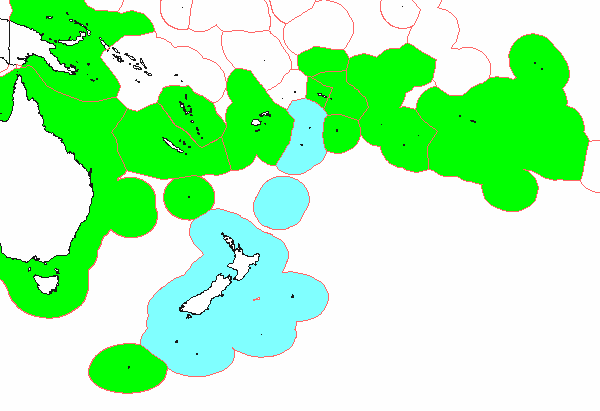
Whale sanctuaries in the South Pacific: Whale sanctuary Whales protected

Since 1978, whales within New Zealand's 200-nautical-mile (370 km) exclusive economic zone have been protected under the Marine Mammals Protection Act 1978. Killing a whale or other cetacean is punishable by up to six months imprisonment, or a fine of up to NZ$250,000. Efforts are now often made to save whales that have stranded or have become entangled in marine debris.

There is a vocal antiwhaling sentiment in New Zealand. The Government regularly attends the International Whaling Commission meetings and supports the moratorium on whaling, as well as advocating for the creation of whale sanctuaries.

In 2010, Pete Bethune, an antiwhaling activist, was detained by Japanese whalers when he boarded a whaling ship in the southern oceans. He was convicted in Japan and deported back to New Zealand.

== See also ==
- History of New Zealand
- Conservation in New Zealand
- Butler Point Whaling Museum
- Johnny Jones
- Joe Perano
- Thomas Chaseland
- Weller brothers
