= Cyamus catodontis =

Scientific classification
- Kingdom: Animalia
- Phylum: Arthropoda
- Clade: Pancrustacea
- Class: Malacostraca
- Order: Amphipoda
- Family: Cyamidae
- Genus: Cyamus
- Species: C. catodontis

Binomial name
- Cyamus catodontis Margolis,1954

Species of whale louse

Cyamus catodontis is a parasitic whale louse in the family Cyamidae. They reside exclusively on the skin of male sperm whales (Physeter macrocephalus); female sperm whales and their calves host Neocyamus physeteris.

== Description ==
Males of the species can reach up to 7.2 mm (0.28 in) in length, and 2.8 mm (0.11 in) wide. Females reach up to 5.9 mm (0.23 in) in length with a width of 2.4 mm (0.094 in). The females possess an extra pair of ventral spines located on segment 5 of their bodies.
