= Oruaiti Chapel =

Church in Northland, New Zealand

Coordinates: 35°44′34.63″S 174°16′19.38″E

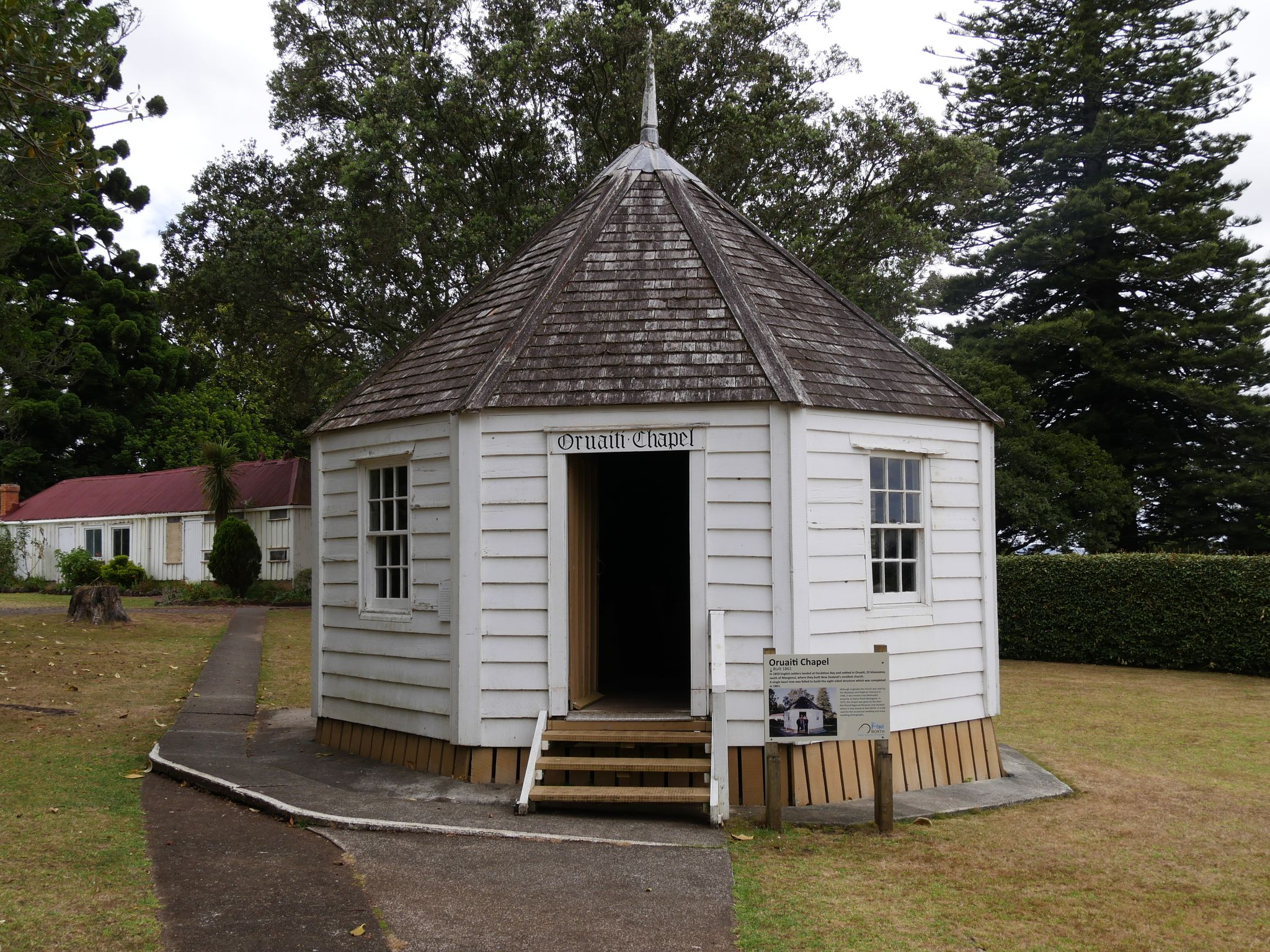
Oruaiti Chapel

Oruaiti Chapel is an octagonal shaped non-denominational church made from locally milled kauri timber. It was constructed in 1860/61 by settler Thomas Ball in the small settlement of Oruaiti near the Mangonui Harbour, on his own land, for members of the local community. In 1864 a library was established in the building, and in 1892 the land and buildings were sold to the Foster family who retained ownership until 1936 when the church and the land it was sited on were gifted to the Methodist Church. The building was relocated in 1946 to Whangarei and in 1975, the building was relocated to its present site at the Northland Regional Museum in Maunu, Whangarei. The chapel is on the Heritage New Zealand list of historic places as a Category 2 Reg No:3291 and was registered on 22 August 1991.

== History ==
The church was built by settler Thomas Ball and others from kauri Ball had supplied and was opened on 7 April 1861. The report of the time period described the building as octagonal in form, with weatherboard framing and a steep-pitched roof thatched with rushes and was well lit. Ball it was also noted had financed the building of the church at his own expense. In 1864, the church was referred to as the Octagon House of Worship and a small reading library was present. In 1878 a subsidy of £2 towards a public library located inside the church was granted by the government. During 1886, a meeting was held to determine if the building should be renovated with a replacement roof made from kauri shingles, the work was agreed to and carried out by Mr Whitehead and his son Thomas. The building was reroofed again using kauri shingles in 1919.

In 1892, the Ball property the church was sited upon was sold to Joseph and Samuel Foster, passing on to the latter and eventually into the ownership of John Foster and retained by the family until 1936 when the church and the site it was located on were ceded to the Methodist Church. In 1933, while still under the ownership of the Fosters the building was moved on skids and relocated closer to the roadside to allow better access.

In 1946, the building was moved to Whangarei for use as a church museum.
