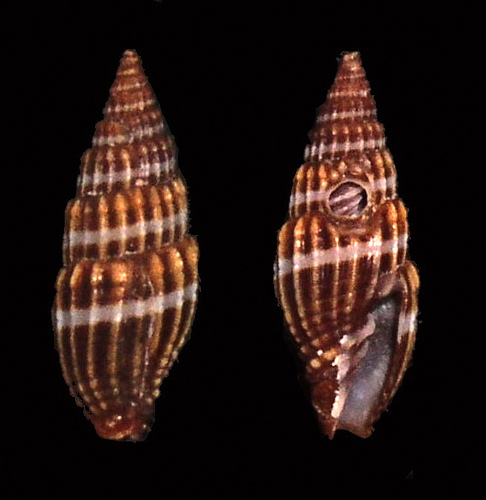
- Vexillum virgo

Scientific classification
- Kingdom: Animalia
- Phylum: Mollusca
- Class: Gastropoda
- Subclass: Caenogastropoda
- Order: Neogastropoda
- Superfamily: Turbinelloidea
- Family: Costellariidae
- Genus: Vexillum
- Species: V. virgo

Binomial name
- Vexillum virgo (Linnaeus, 1767)

Synonyms
- Mitra (Turricula) cruentata (Gmelin, 1791) superseded combination; Mitra armillata Reeve, 1845; Mitra cruentata (Gmelin, 1791); Mitra cruentata var. proxima G. Nevill & H. Nevill, 1875; Mitra cruentata var. sandvichensis G. Nevill & H. Nevill, 1875·; Mitra harpifera Lamarck, J.B.P.A. de, 1811; Mitra harpaeformis Lamarck, J.B.P.A. de, 1822; Vexillum (Costellaria) virgo (Linnaeus, 1767); Vexillum cruentatum (Gmelin, 1791); Vexillum harpiferum J.B.P.A. Lamarck, 1811; Vexillum proxima Nevill, G. & H. Nevill, 1875; Vexillum sandwichensis Nevill, G. & H. Nevill, 1875; Voluta cruentata Gmelin, J.F., 1791; Voluta virgo Linnaeus, 1767 (original combination)

= Vexillum virgo =

Species of gastropod

Vexillum virgo, common name : the virgin mitre, is a species of small sea snail, marine gastropod mollusk in the family Costellariidae, the ribbed miters.

== Description ==
The shell size varies between 13 mm and 25 mm (half an inch to one inch).

The shortly conical shell is stout round the upper part. The spire is truncated, depressly hidden. It is transversely closely engraved throughout with very fine slightly punctured grooves. The shell is whitish or yellowish; the base is tipped with blackish violet. The columella is four-plaited, with a callosity at the upper part.

== Distribution ==
This species occurs in the Red Sea and in the Indo-West Pacific and in the Pacific Ocean off Samoa; also off the Philippines and Australia (Northern Territory, Queensland) and Papua New Guinea.
