= Elwyn Richardson =

New Zealand educator and author

Elwyn Richardson QSO
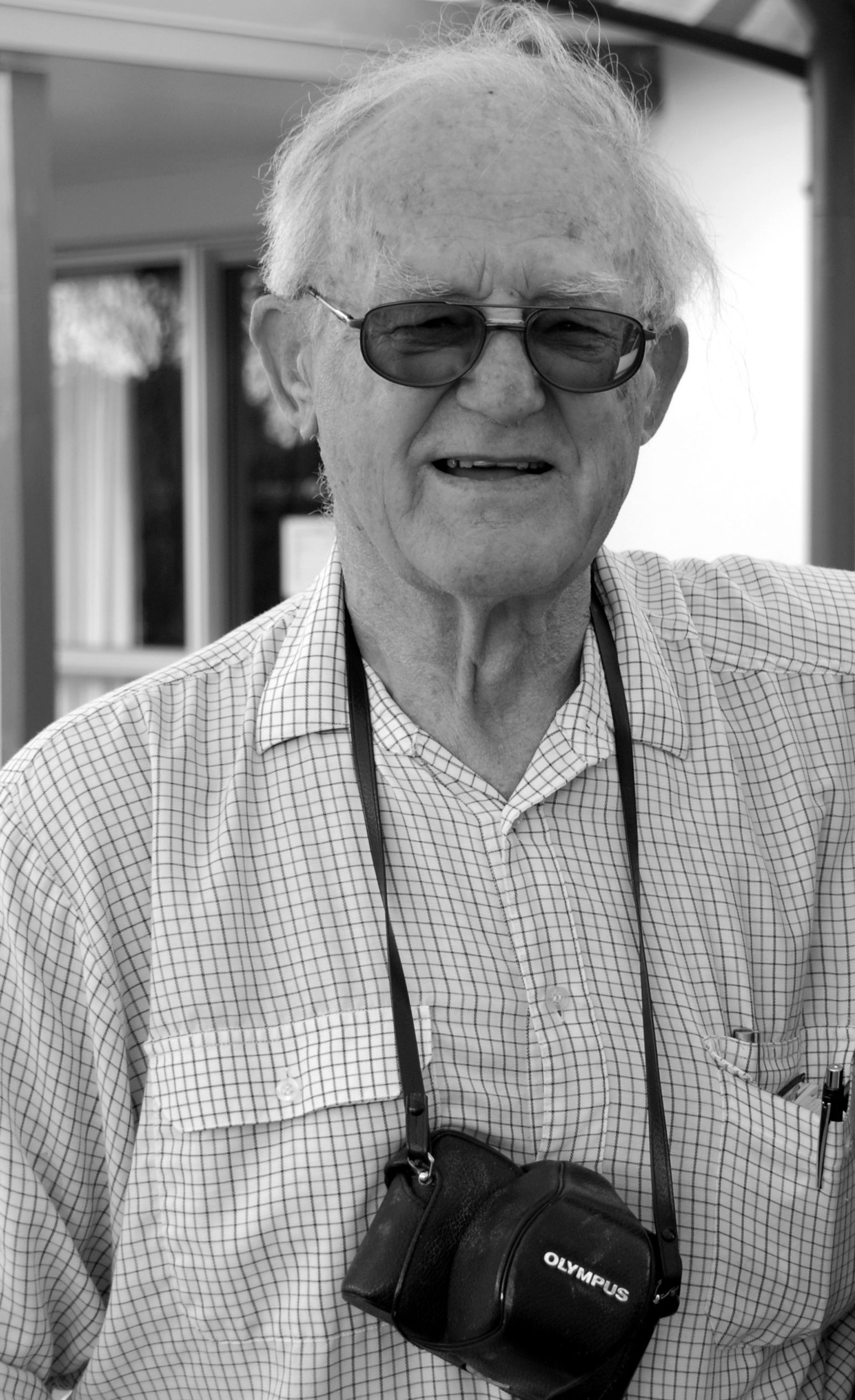
- Richardson visiting Oruaiti School, 2008
- Born: Elwyn Stuart Richardson; 8 July 1925; Ōtāhuhu, New Zealand
- Died: 24 December 2012 (aged 87); Auckland, New Zealand

Elwyn Stuart Richardson QSO (8 July 1925 – 24 December 2012) was a New Zealand educator. He is best known for his book In the Early World a record of the development of his educational philosophy while working at a small country school in Northland, New Zealand from 1949 to 1962. On the strength of his early work, the school was granted ‘experimental status’ by Clarence Beeby, Director of Education, a special consideration that allowed him to develop his own teaching methods and curriculum largely unimpeded by school inspectors. From 1969 to 1972 Richardson worked at American universities as a visiting lecturer. Richardson is considered a significant figure in New Zealand education because of his own work and educational writings and the critical impact of his educational philosophy internationally.

== Early life ==
Richardson was born 8 July 1925 in Ōtāhuhu, New Zealand, the second of two sons of a farming family of small means. His early childhood was spent on Waiheke Island where his family farmed dairy cattle. An early mentor, Walford Outram Moffat Camille Fowler, who was hired to work on the farm when Richardson was three years old, had a profound influence on Richardson ideas about teaching and learning. A keen zoologist, Fowler introduced Richardson to the scientific wonders of the natural world and took over his early education.

At eight years old Richardson was accepted to Dilworth School in 1933, a private boarding school in Auckland for boys from disadvantaged backgrounds. Richardson remained at Dilworth until he was 14, leaving on 13 December 1940. He then attended Mt Albert Grammar School and following this, undertook a Bachelor of Science degree from the University of Auckland, studying geology, chemistry and botany while working part-time as an industrial chemist in the amalgamated brick, pipe and pottery division of Crown Lynn a ceramics manufacturer. In 1946 he applied to Auckland College of Education and after completing his 'Division A' (Primary/Elementary) course in February 1948, spent his probationary teaching year at Puni School near Pukekohe. He applied for the remote country position at Oruaiti School in 1949 largely because of its distinct fauna of sea life, but also because the sole-charge posting offered him the opportunity to work out his own ideas about teaching and learning alone. In particular, he was intrigued by the species Agnewia tritoniformis, a rare, delicate pink gastropod mollusc from the muricid family.

== Educational philosophy ==
Richardson’s educational philosophy was based on the belief that all real learning must be anchored in personal experience. It was this conviction that provided the foundation for his developmental approach to education. Central to this was his theory of integration, a personalised process whereby children moved from one expressive medium to another, between all subject areas. Richardson’s theory of integration was informed by his conception of artistic ability as a universal human attribute, his well-developed ideas about the nature of artistic development in children and a firm belief in the learning potential of every child.

== Oruaiti School ==
Richardson viewed himself first and foremost as a scientist. At Oruaiti School he discarded the official syllabus and turned to the children’s lives and immediate environment for the basis of his curriculum. Using the children’s natural curiosity and interest, Richardson taught them how to observe closely the world around them and to record their new discoveries and their own responses to these. From here, he developed a school programme that was anchored in the children’s surroundings and real lives. Through environmental study the children learned the basis of scientific method, and brought these skills to bear on studies that spanned all subjects. His method was a revolt away from science as a separate subject to an integrated programme of arts and science. ‘The Oruaiti Experiment’ as it became known, was approved, on the understanding that Richardson would write a yearly report and a serious document at the conclusion of the experiment. In The Early World published by The New Zealand Council for Educational Research NZCER in 1964, was the product of this. The book tells the story of how Richardson’s students became increasingly aware of their own capacity for personal expression, while collectively establishing a shared understanding of aesthetic values.

The book was well received by the New Zealand educational establishment and widely taken up as a text by teacher training colleges in New Zealand in the 1960s and 1970s. Joseph Featherstone, former professor of education emeritus at Michigan State University, reviewed the book for the New Republic magazine and stated, “it may be the best book about teaching ever written.” Following Featherstone’s review Pantheon Books published a Canadian and an American edition simultaneously in 1969. The books were praised by international reviewers such as Jonathan Kozol in The New York Times Book Review and R. W. B. Lewis who wrote, “Not only does this book point to a new direction in education, its very existence is a landmark in the recognition of human potential and dignity.” Over the next decade Richardson and his school became an international symbol of progressive education in New Zealand with a particular focus on arts and crafts. His book was used in teacher education programmes in the United States, particularly in the area of developing reading and writing skills in young children. A third edition with a new foreword and a twenty-page appendix of children's art work was published by NZCER in June 2012. The book is also available as an ebook.

== Teaching career ==
Richardson’s work at Oruaiti was followed by a brief period lecturing in English at Auckland College of Education from 1961–62. He then spent two years as Principal at Hay Park School in Auckland, followed by eighteen years as Principal of Lincoln Heights School from 1966 to 1969 and 1972–1987. The publication of In The Early World, led to an invitation from the University of Colorado in 1969 to work as a visiting lecturer.

Over the next three years Richardson divided his time between the University of Colorado Boulder, Bank Street College of Education in New York, the University of Illinois at Urbana-Champaign, the University of Washington in Seattle, and South Dakota State University (SDSU) in Brookings. As part of this work, under the auspices of SDSU, Richardson worked with students and faculty from Oglala Lakota College to enhance visual and performing arts in schools on the Native American Pine Ridge Reservation. After his service during these years, Richardson was nominated for an honorary doctorate degree from SDSU for his service and leadership in education in 2001.

Richardson returned to New Zealand in 1972 and resumed his position as Principal of Lincoln Heights School until retiring in 1987 at 62 years of age. He continued to write books on education and scientific papers, which he largely produced in limited editions by hand in his Taupaki printery.

Richardson died in Auckland on 24 December 2012.

== Awards and honours ==
In the 1989 Queen's Birthday Honours, Richardson was appointed a Companion of the Queen’s Service Order for public services, and in 2005, he received an honorary doctorate in literature from Massey University. In August 2007, the Auckland Faculty of Education honored Richardson’s work by opening a permanent display of artefacts from Oruaiti School in the main foyer of the building.

== Selected publications ==
=== Books ===
- In the Early World. New Zealand Council for Educational Research, 1964, 1971 (2nd ed.), 2001, 2012 (3rd ed.).
- The Wonder of Child Reality: the description of a creative language programme, Henderson, New Zealand: E. S. Richardson, 1981.
- Provisions for Creative, Gifted and Talented Children, Henderson, New Zealand: E. S. Richardson, 1993.
- Into a Further World. Henderson, New Zealand: E. S. Richardson, 2001.
- Creative processes in language arts teaching. Henderson, New Zealand: E. S. Richardson, 2003
- A Folio of Oruaiti Paintings (1959–1961). Henderson, New Zealand: E. S. Richardson, 2004.
- Integration in Language Arts Expression a Valedictory Essay. Henderson, New Zealand: E. S. Richardson, 2004.

=== Scientific writing ===
- Richardson, Elwyn. Proceedings of the Taupaki Malacological Society. Taupaki Malacological Society, New Zealand: 1997.
- Richardson, Elwyn. Additions to the stratigraphy, molluscan & fish otolith faunas of the Haweran (Middle Pleistocene) Te Piki member, Cape Runaway, New Zealand. Taupaki Malacological Society, New Zealand: 1999
- Richardson, Elwyn. Further molluscan records from the Te Piki Member, Cape Runaway, with the description of two new species. Taupaki Malacological Society, New Zealand: Vol. 1. no. 1. 1997.
- Richardson, Elwyn, Werner Schwarzhans, Hugh R Grenfell,. Molluscan faunas from five early Nukumaruan (2.4 Ma) outcrops in Hawkes bay, New Zealand. Taupaki Malacological Society, New Zealand: V.3. 2002.
