= Cyamus rhytinae =

Scientific classification
- Kingdom: Animalia
- Phylum: Arthropoda
- Clade: Pancrustacea
- Class: Malacostraca
- Order: Amphipoda
- Family: Cyamidae
- Genus: Cyamus
- Species: C. rhytinae

Binomial name
- Cyamus rhytinae (J.F. Brandt, 1846)

Synonyms
- Sirenocyamus rhytinae J.F. Brandt, 1846

Species of whale louse

Cyamus rhytinae is a species of whale louse.
