= Hihi, New Zealand =

Hihi
- Interactive map of Hihi
- Coordinates: 34.973473°S 173.541525°E
- Country: New Zealand
- Region: Northland Region
- District: Far North District
- Ward: Te Hiku
- Community: Te Hiku
- Subdivision: Doubtless Bay
- Electorates: Northland; Te Tai Tokerau

Government
  - Territorial Authority: Far North District Council
  - Regional council: Northland Regional Council
  - Mayor of Far North: Moko Tepania
  - Northland MP: Grant McCallum
  - Te Tai Tokerau MP: Mariameno Kapa-Kingi

Area
  - Total: 1.43 km^{2} (0.55 sq mi)

Population (June 2025)
  - Total: 240
  - Density: 170/km^{2} (430/sq mi)

Hihi or Hihi Beach is a village and rural community in the Far North District and Northland Region of New Zealand's North Island.

The local Waitetoki Marae is a meeting place for the local Ngāti Kahu hapū of Ngāti Ruaiti. Unlike many other marae, it does not have a meeting house.

Hihi was visited by an American whaling ship in 1792. It became a whaling centre between the 1820s and 1850s.

Butler Point Whaling Museum, located in the village, includes artefacts from American and European whalers, and from Ngāti Kahu.

== Demographics ==
Statistics New Zealand describes Hihi as a rural settlement. It covers 1.43 km^{2} (0.55 sq mi) and had an estimated population of 240 as of June 2025, with a population density of 168 people per km^{2}. Hihi is part of the larger Taemaro-Oruaiti statistical area.

Historical population
Year	Pop.	±% p.a.
2006	168	—
2013	156	−1.05%
2018	171	+1.85%
2023	231	+6.20%

Hihi had a population of 231 in the 2023 New Zealand census, an increase of 60 people (35.1%) since the 2018 census, and an increase of 75 people (48.1%) since the 2013 census. There were 117 males and 114 females in 96 dwellings. 1.3% of people identified as LGBTIQ+. The median age was 59.2 years (compared with 38.1 years nationally). There were 27 people (11.7%) aged under 15 years, 27 (11.7%) aged 15 to 29, 93 (40.3%) aged 30 to 64, and 84 (36.4%) aged 65 or older.

People could identify as more than one ethnicity. The results were 71.4% European (Pākehā), 40.3% Māori, 6.5% Pasifika, 3.9% Asian, and 2.6% other, which includes people giving their ethnicity as "New Zealander". English was spoken by 98.7%, Māori language by 11.7%, and other languages by 5.2%. The percentage of people born overseas was 15.6, compared with 28.8% nationally.

Religious affiliations were 28.6% Christian, 1.3% Islam, 2.6% Māori religious beliefs, 1.3% Buddhist, and 1.3% other religions. People who answered that they had no religion were 61.0%, and 5.2% of people did not answer the census question.

Of those at least 15 years old, 24 (11.8%) people had a bachelor's or higher degree, 114 (55.9%) had a post-high school certificate or diploma, and 66 (32.4%) people exclusively held high school qualifications. The median income was $26,400, compared with $41,500 nationally. 12 people (5.9%) earned over $100,000 compared to 12.1% nationally. The employment status of those at least 15 was that 60 (29.4%) people were employed full-time, 24 (11.8%) were part-time, and 3 (1.5%) were unemployed.
