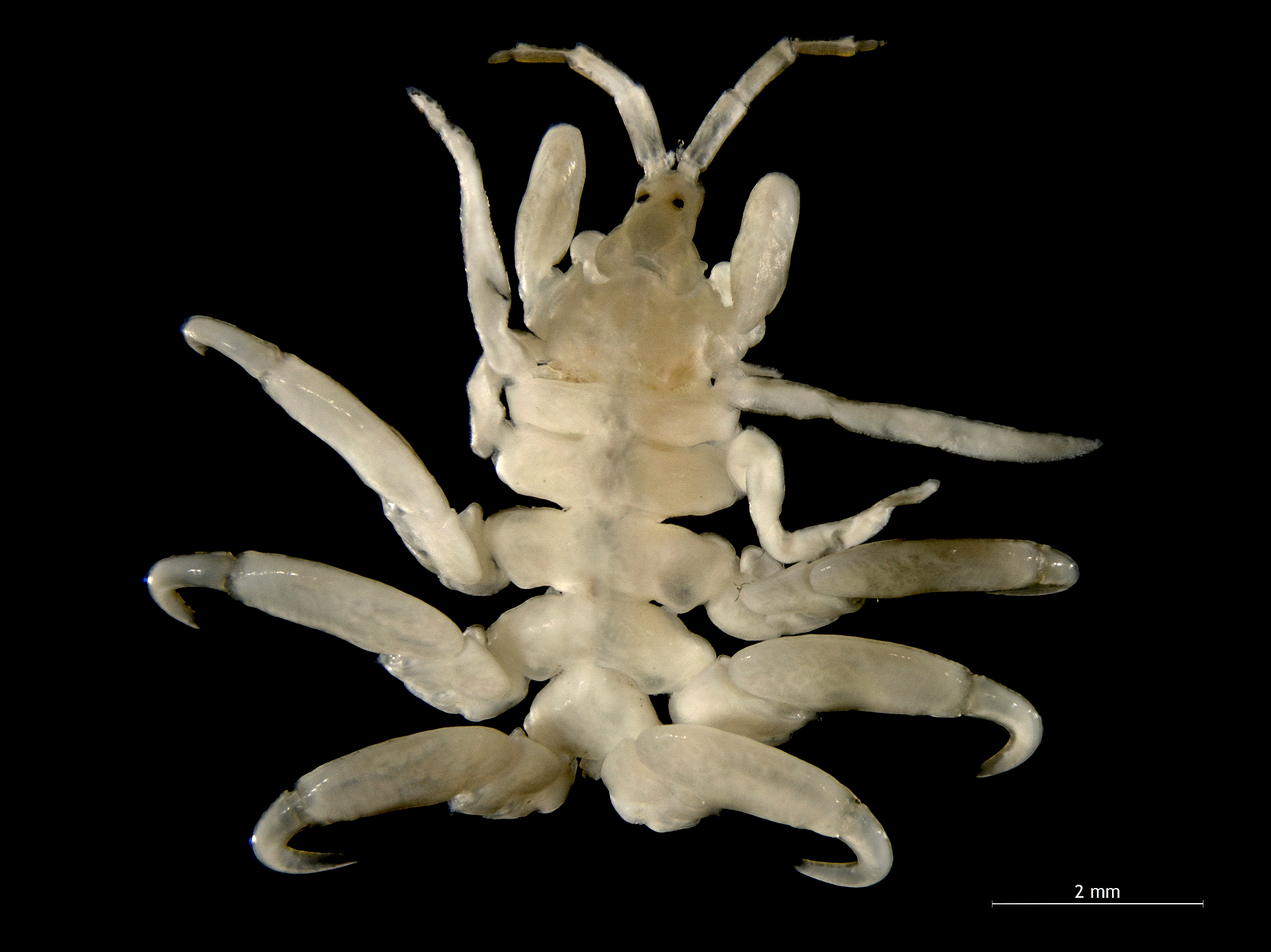
- Dorsal view
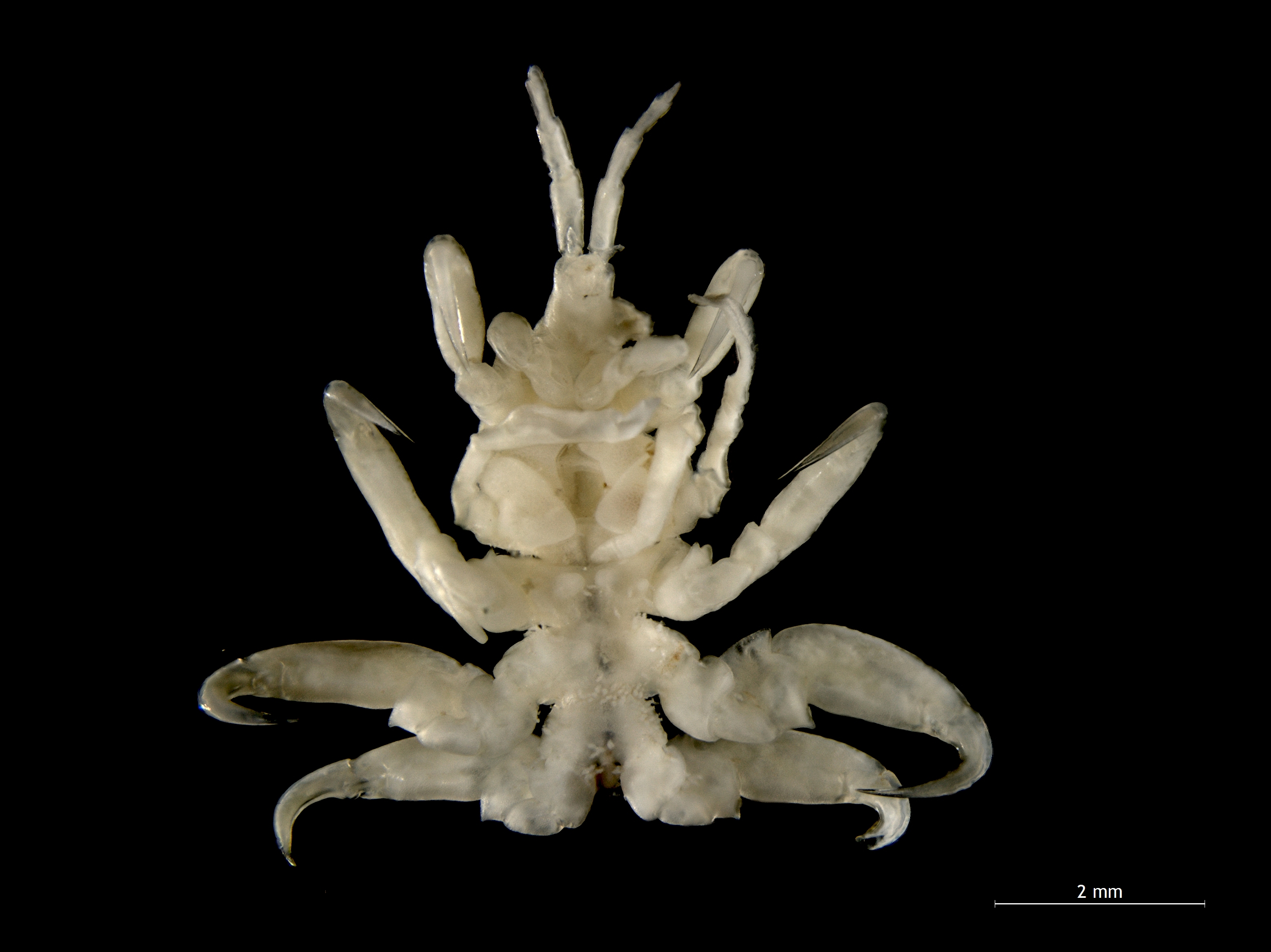
- Ventral view

Scientific classification
- Kingdom: Animalia
- Phylum: Arthropoda
- Clade: Pancrustacea
- Class: Malacostraca
- Order: Amphipoda
- Family: Cyamidae
- Genus: Cyamus
- Species: C. boopis

Binomial name
- Cyamus boopis Lütken, 1870

Synonyms
- Cyamus ceti (Linnaeus, 1758) sensu Chilton, 1884; Cyamus elongatus Hiro, 1938; Cyamus pacificus Lütken, 1873; Cyamus suffuses Dall, 1872; Paracyamus boopis

= Cyamus boopis =

Species of crustacean

Cyamus boopis is a species of whale louse in the family Cyamidae. It occurs in the Atlantic and Southern Oceans, possibly wider.

This is an ectoparasite that lives exclusively on humpback whales. The infestation is most concentrated around the genital apertures, but occurs on all parts of the body, most commonly where there is an infestation of the barnacle species Coronula diadema.

Whale lice will promptly try to attach themselves to people when handling whales during processing.

== Description ==
Males of the species grow to about 11.5 mm long and 4 mm wide, with the first antenna being about 5.25 mm long. Females grow to 9.5 mm long and 4 mm wide with the first antenna 3.5 mm.

Both sexes have four-segmented antennae, the endmost containing strong bristles. The body comprises multiple segments, each containing hooks used to attach itself to the whale.
