= Butler Point Whaling Museum =

Museum at Hihi, New Zealand

Coordinates: 34.9841°S 173.5365°E

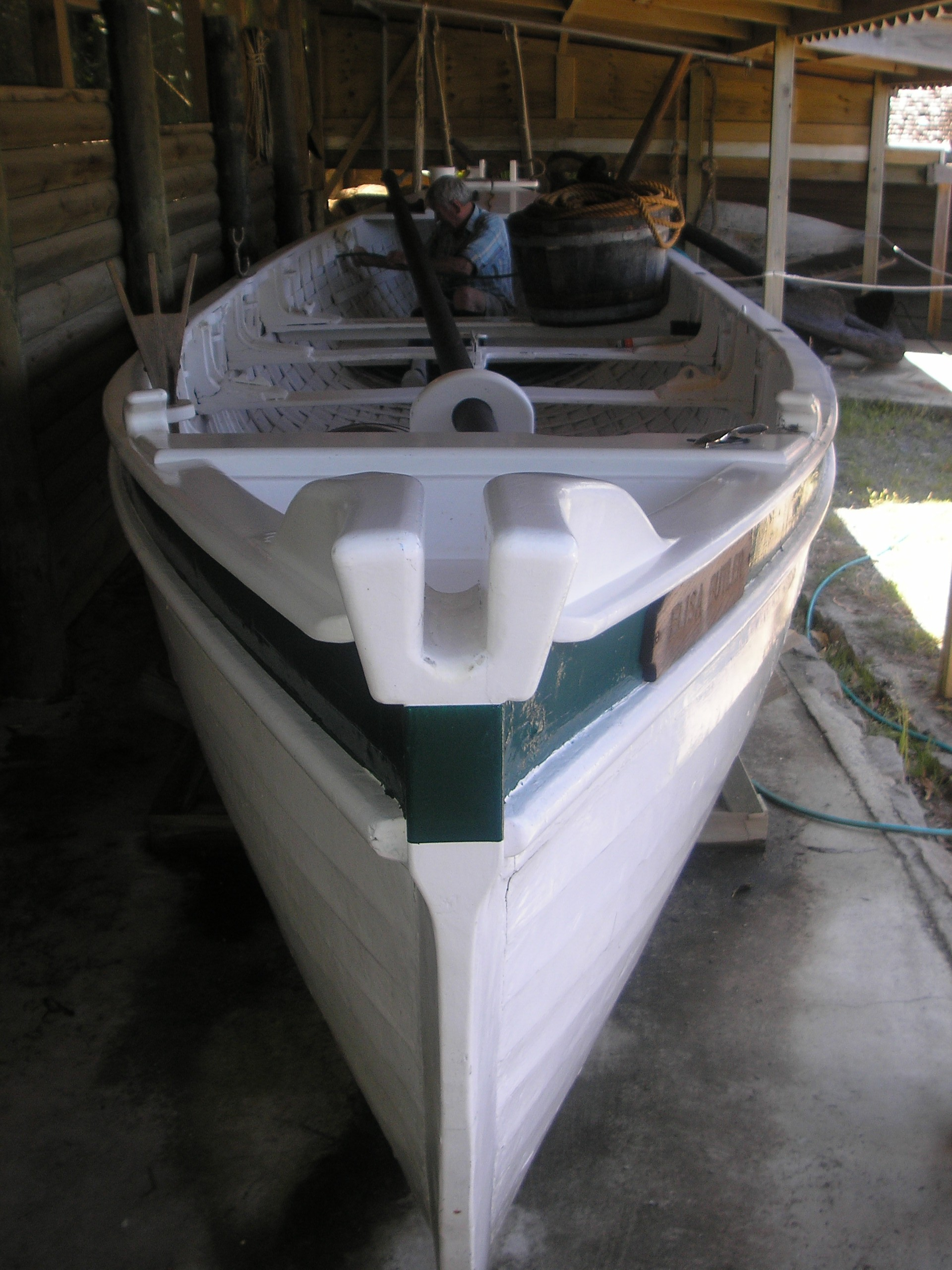
A restored whaling boat at Butler Point

Butler Point Whaling Museum is located at Hihi, near Mangonui in New Zealand's Doubtless Bay, a popular supply centre for international whaling and maritime fleets in the 1820s–1860s.

The Butler Point property comprises the house which was relocated to its current situation in 1847 by whale ship captain and entrepreneur William Butler. It was moved from its earlier position on nearby Paewhenua Island, just across the bay. The homestead has been well preserved by the current owners and contains several heirloom items. There is also a purpose built museum housing one of the finest collections of whaling artefacts in the country, including a restored, fully equipped whaling boat, tryworks, a collection of harpoons, models, scrimshaw and items from the whalers who called into Doubtless Bay, including the US whaling ship, Charles W. Morgan, the last surviving wooden whaleship in the world. In addition, there are extensive sub-tropical gardens and grounds on the property, including a 12 metre circumference pōhutukawa tree, one of the largest in Aotearoa New Zealand.

Butler House is listed as a grade 1 heritage building by Heritage New Zealand, and the grounds have been formally recognised as a Garden of Significance (with a 5-star rating) by the New Zealand Gardens Trust. The owners and curators since 1970 are members of the Ferguson family.

The property is historically and culturally significant, including Moehuri pā and examples of early archaeology. The pā has been extensively excavated and is well interpreted. It helps to tell the story of early Māori settlement and connection to local iwi, originally Ngati Kahu.

The most notable publication about Captain William Butler and the history of the property is to be found in Janice Mogford's book, "The Butler House, Mangonui 1847-1990".

- Whaling in New Zealand
