= Cyamus =

Scientific classification
- Kingdom: Animalia
- Phylum: Arthropoda
- Clade: Pancrustacea
- Class: Malacostraca
- Order: Amphipoda
- Family: Cyamidae
- Subfamily: Cyaminae
- Genus: Cyamus; Latreille, 1796

Synonyms
- Paracyamus Sars, 1894; Sirenocyamus J.F. Brandt, 1846; Larunda Leach, 1815; Panope Leach, 1814; Pediculus Seba, 1734

Genus of whale louse

Cyamus is a genus of whale louse.

There are 14 species assigned to this genus:

- Cyamus boopis Lütken, 1870
- Cyamus catodontis Margolis, 1954
- Cyamus ceti (Linnaeus, 1758)
- Cyamus erraticus Roussel de Vauzème, 1834
- Cyamus eschrichtii Margolis, McDonald & Bousfield, 2000
- Cyamus gracilis Roussel de Vauzème, 1834
- Cyamus kessleri A. Brandt, 1873
- Cyamus mesorubraedon Margolis, McDonald & Bousfield, 2000
- Cyamus monodontis Lütken, 1870
- Cyamus nodosus Lütken, 1861
- Cyamus orubraedon Waller, 1989
- Cyamus ovalis Roussel de Vauzème, 1834
- Cyamus rhytinae (J.F. Brandt, 1846)
- Cyamus scammoni Dall, 1872
