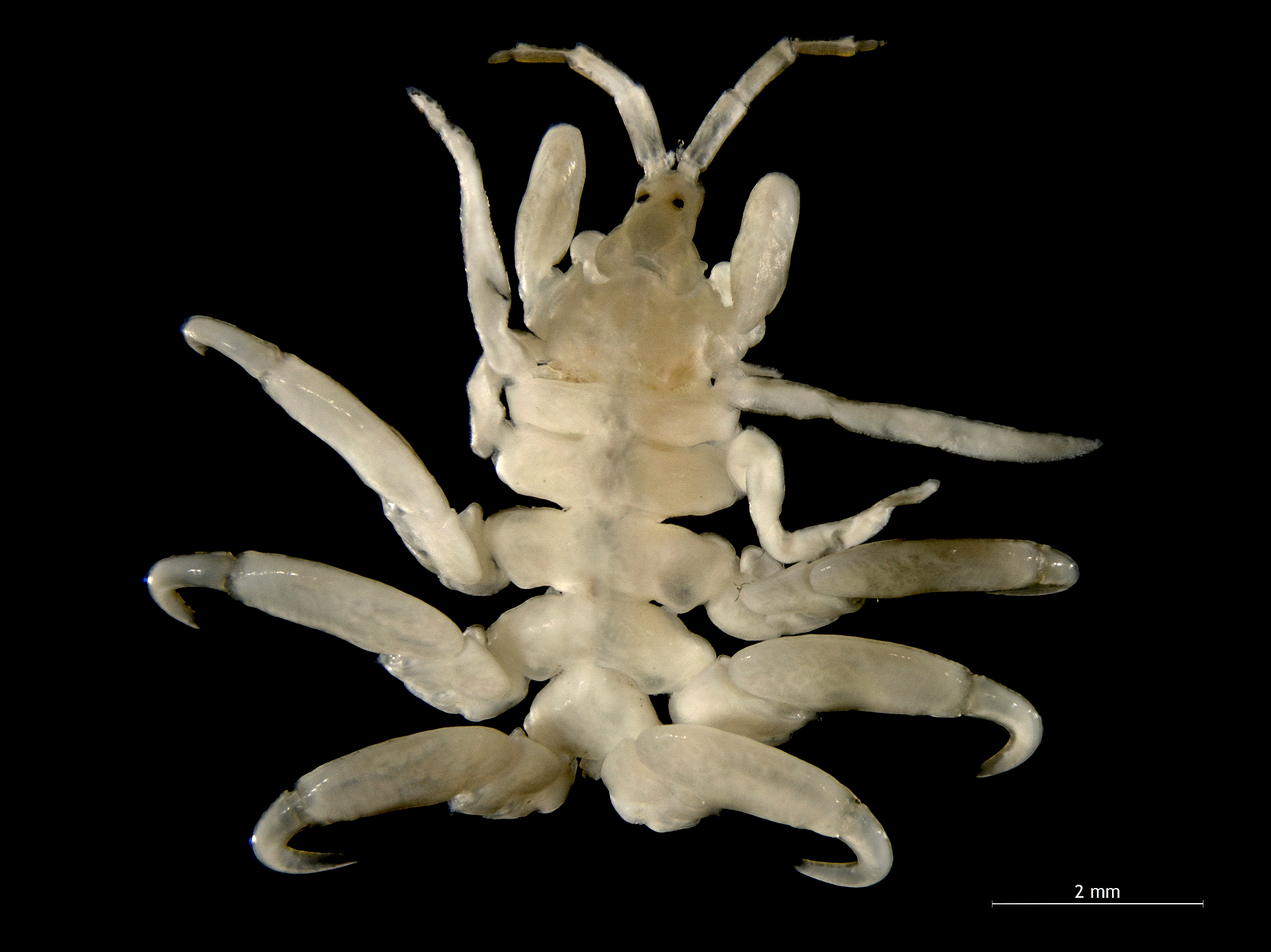
- Cyamus boopis female

Scientific classification
- Kingdom: Animalia
- Phylum: Arthropoda
- Clade: Pancrustacea
- Class: Malacostraca
- Order: Amphipoda
- Suborder: Senticaudata
- Infraorder: Corophiida
- Parvorder: Caprellidira
- Superfamily: Caprelloidea
- Family: Cyamidae; Rafinesque, 1815

Genera
- Cyamus; Isocyamus; Neocyamus; Platycyamus; Scutocyamus; Sirenocyamus; Syncyamus

= Whale louse =

Whale lice

Family of crustaceans

A whale louse is a crustacean of the family Cyamidae. Despite the name, it is not a true louse (which are insects), but rather is related to the skeleton shrimp, most species of which are found in shallower waters. Whale lice are external parasites, found in skin lesions, genital folds, nostrils and eyes of marine mammals of the order Cetacea. These include not only whales but also dolphins and porpoises.

== Appearance ==
The body of a whale louse is distinctly flat and considerably reduced at the rear. Its legs, especially the back three pairs of legs, have developed into claw-like protuberances with which it clings to its host. Its length ranges from 5 to 25 millimetres (0.2 to 1 in) depending on the species.

== Life cycle ==
Most species of whale louse are associated with a single species of whale. They remain with their host throughout their development and will never experience a free-swimming phase. Although the relationship between a specific species of whale louse and a specific species of whale is more pronounced with baleen whales than with toothed whales, almost every species of whale has a louse species that is unique to it. With the sperm whale, the parasitic relationship is sex-specific. The whale louse Cyamus catodontis lives exclusively on the skin of the male, while Neocyamus physeteris is found only on females and calves.

Whale lice attach themselves to the host body in places that protect them from water currents, so they can be found in natural body openings and in wounds; with baleen whales they are found primarily on the head and in the ventral pleats. Up to 7,500 whale lice can live on a single whale.

With some species of whale louse, whale barnacle infestations play an important role. On the right whale, the parasites live mainly on callosities (raised callus-like patches of skin on the whales' heads). The clusters of white lice contrast with the dark skin of the whale, and help researchers identify individual whales because of the lice clusters' unique shapes.

The lice predominantly eat algae that settle on the host's body. They usually feed off the flaking skin of the host and frequent wounds or open areas. They cause minor skin damage, but this does not lead to significant illness.

The development of the whale louse is closely connected with the life pattern of whales. The distribution of various louse species reflects migratory patterns.

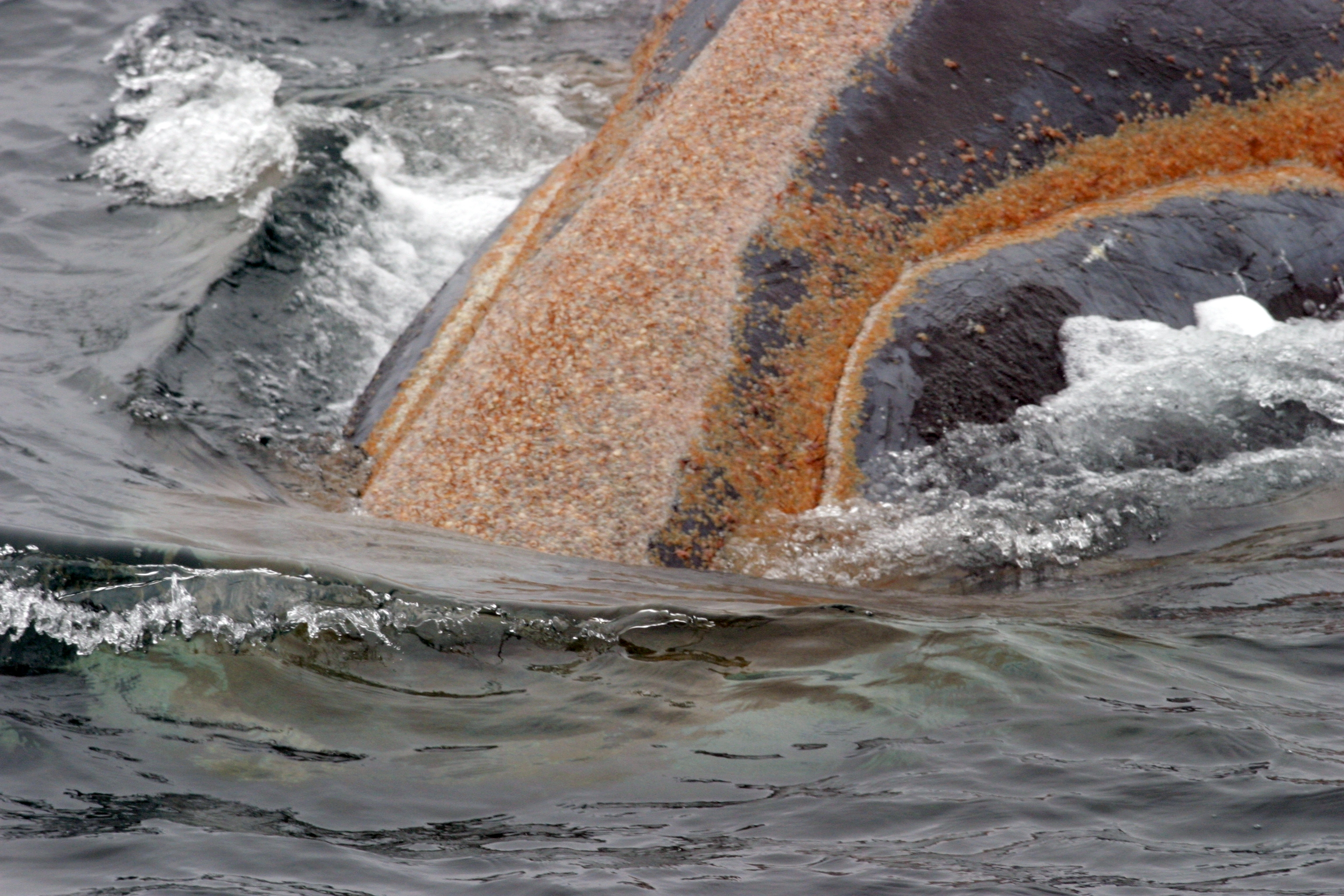
Orange whale lice on a right whale

== Species ==
Currently, 31 species are recognised:

Cyamus Latreille, 1796

- Cyamus antarcticensis Vlasova, 1982
- Cyamus bahamondei Buzeta, 1963
- Cyamus balaenopterae K. H. Barnard, 1931
- Cyamus boopis Lütken, 1870
- Cyamus catodontis Margolis, 1954
- Cyamus ceti (Linnaeus, 1758)
- Cyamus erraticus Roussel de Vauzème, 1834
- Cyamus eschrichtii Margolis, McDonald & Bousfield, 2000
- Cyamus gracilis Roussel de Vauzème, 1834
- Cyamus kessleri A. Brandt, 1873
- Cyamus mesorubraedon Margolis, McDonald & Bousfield, 2000
- Cyamus monodontis Lutken, 1870
- Cyamus nodosus Lutken, 1861
- Cyamus orcini Leung, 1970
- Cyamus orubraedon Waller, 1989
- Cyamus ovalis Roussel de Vauzème, 1834
- Cyamus rhytinae (J. F. Brandt, 1846)
- Cyamus scammoni Dall, 1872

Isocyamus Gervais & van Beneden, 1859

- Isocyamus antarcticensis Vlasova in Berzin & Vlasova, 1982
- Isocyamus delphinii Guérin Méneville, 1836
- Isocyamus deltabrachium Sedlak-Weinstein, 1992
- Isocyamus kogiae Sedlak-Weinstein, 1992

Neocyamus Margolis, 1955

- Neocyamus physeteris (Pouchet, 1888)

Platycyamus Lütken, 1870

- Platycyamus flaviscutatus Waller, 1989
- Platycyamus thompsoni (Gosse, 1855)

Scutocyamus Lincoln & Hurley, 1974

- Scutocyamus antipodensis Lincoln & Hurley, 1980
- Scutocyamus parvus Lincoln & Hurley, 1974

Syncyamus Bowman, 1955

- Syncyamus aequus Lincoln & Hurley, 1981
- Syncyamus chelipes (Costa, 1866)
- Syncyamus ilheusensis Haney, De Almeida & Reid, 2004
- Syncyamus pseudorcae Bowman, 1955
