= Callosity =

Piece of skin that has become thickened

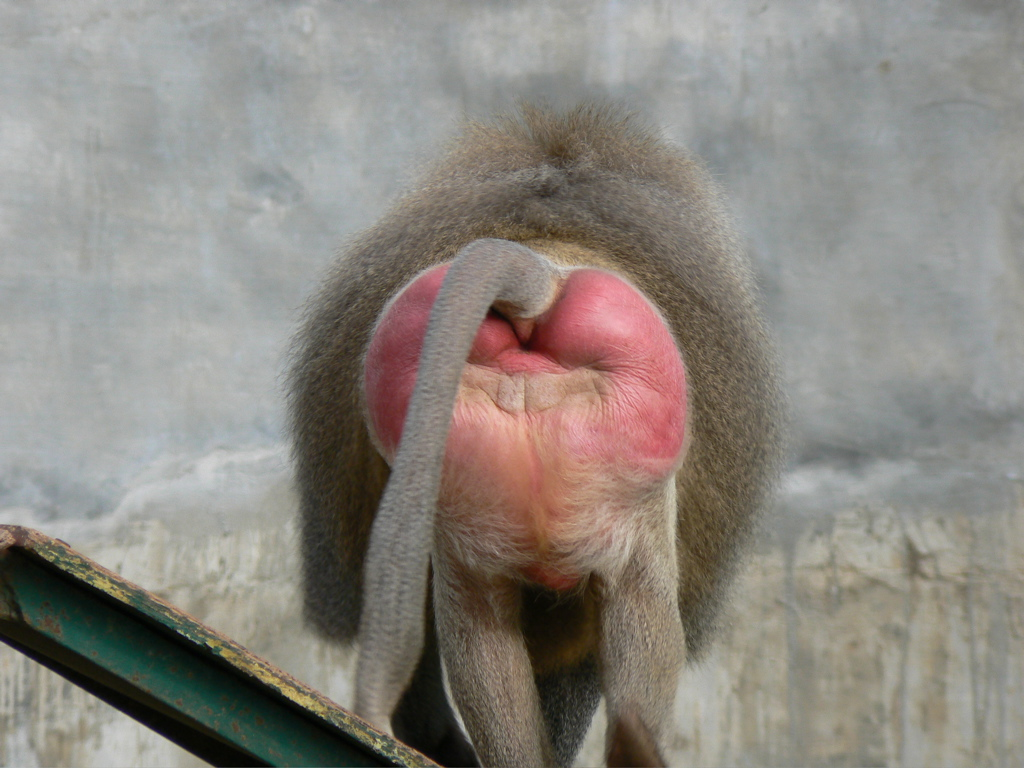
Ischial callosity on a baboon

A callosity is a type of callus, a piece of skin that has become thickened as a result of repeated contact and friction.

== Primates ==
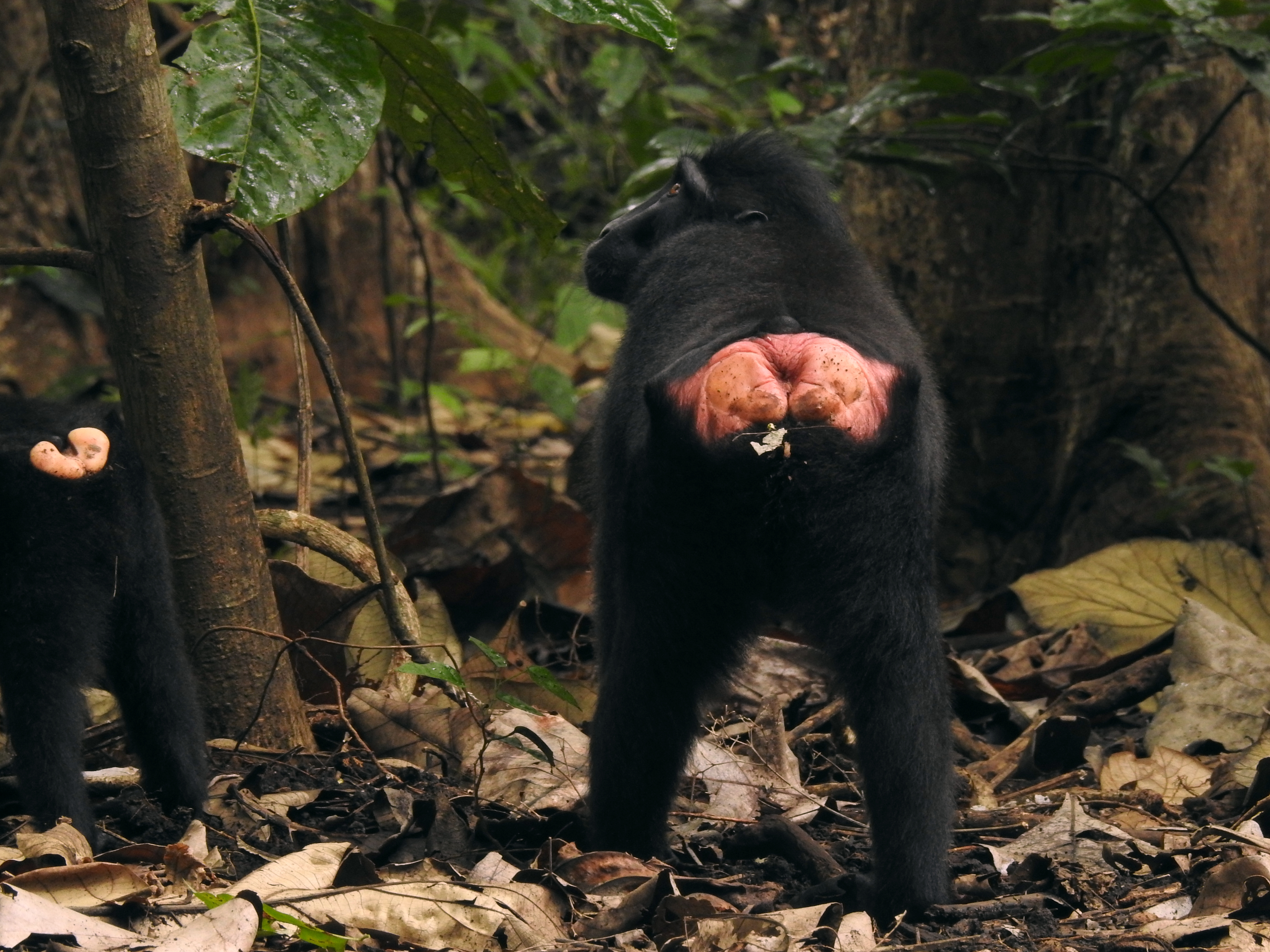
Ischial callosities on a Sulawesi crested macaque Macaca nigra

All Old World monkeys, gibbons, and some chimpanzees have pads on their rears known as ischial callosities. The pads enable the monkeys to sleep sitting upright on thin branches, beyond reach of predators, without falling. Humans do not possess ischial callosities due to the gluteal muscles being large enough to provide the same cushioning.

The ischial callosities are one of the most distinctive pelvic features which separates Old World monkeys from New World monkeys.

== Right whales ==
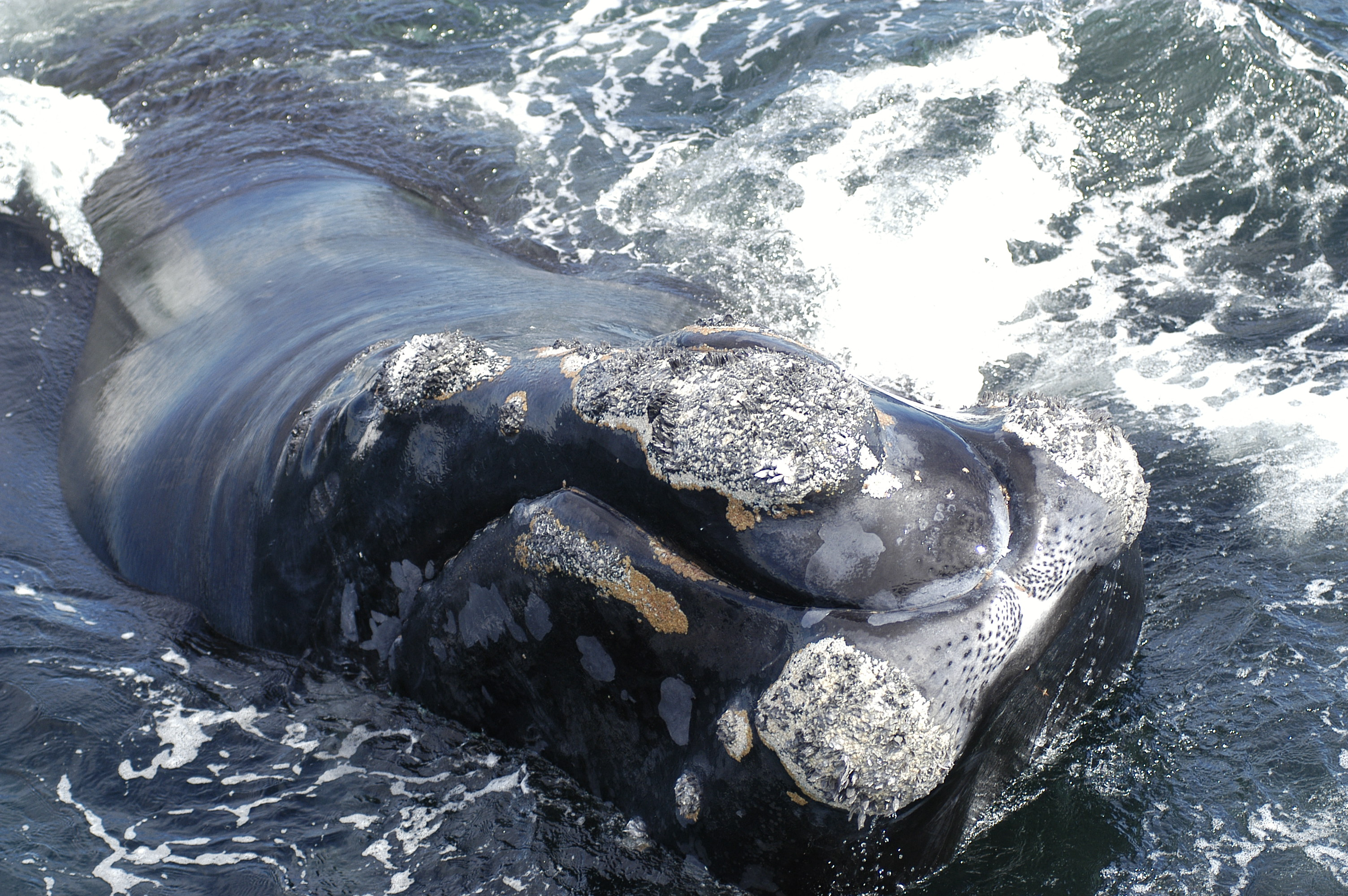
Callosities on a North Atlantic right whale

In whales, callosities are rough, calcified skin patches found on the heads of the three species of right whales. Callosities are a characteristic feature of the whale genus Eubalaena. Because they are found on the head of the whale and appear white against the dark background of the whale's skin, they allow the reliable identification of individuals of the species.

The callosities themselves are grey, but their white appearance is due to large colonies of whale lice, whale barnacles and parasitic worms which reside on them. Young whales and diseased individuals are often infested with a different species of cyamid, which gives the callosities on those whales an orange hue rather than white. Callosities arise naturally and are present even in late-term whale fetuses, although the work of lice digging into the surface of the skin may make them more jagged and hard over time.

Callosities are found on the upper surface of the whale's head: above the eyes, on the jawline and chin, and surrounding the blowholes. Callosities form a unique pattern on every right whale and, although callosities which are overgrown break off, the patterns do not change over a lifetime.

The evolutionary significance of callosities is unknown. Male right whales have a higher density of callosities than females. Males have been observed scratching one another with their callosities and it has been suggested by Payne & Dorsey (1983) that they are a sexually dimorphic feature, used for intra-specific sexual aggression. That explanation is not entirely satisfactory, because it does not account for the appearance of callosities in females. It has also been proposed that the barnacles attached to callosities are important in helping fend off attacks by orcas.

== See also ==
- Callus
