= Joe Perano =

New Zealand fisherman and whaler

Joseph August Perano (10 October 1876 – 17 August 1951) was a New Zealand fisherman and whaler. He was born in Dunedin, Otago, New Zealand in 1876. He founded the last whaling station in New Zealand, and his sons were running the station in 1964 when the last whale was killed on the New Zealand coast. Perano Head, a headland in the Marlborough Sounds, is named for him.
