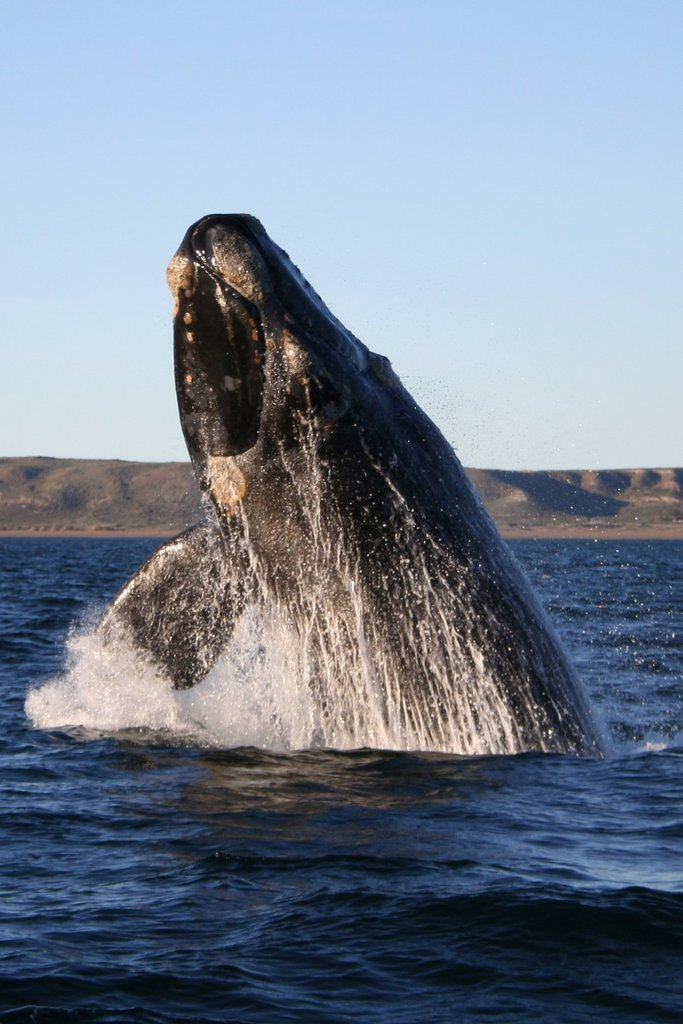
- Southern right whale breaching
- Size compared to an average human

Scientific classification
- Kingdom: Animalia
- Phylum: Chordata
- Class: Mammalia
- Order: Artiodactyla
- Infraorder: Cetacea
- Family: Balaenidae
- Genus: Eubalaena; Gray, 1864

Type species
- Balaena australis Desmoulins, 1822

Species
- E. australis – Southern (Desmoulins, 1822); †E. ianitrix Bisconti, Lambert, and Bosselaers, 2017; E. glacialis – North Atlantic (Müller, 1776); E. japonica – North Pacific (Lacépède, 1818); †E. shinshuensis Kimura & Narita, 2007
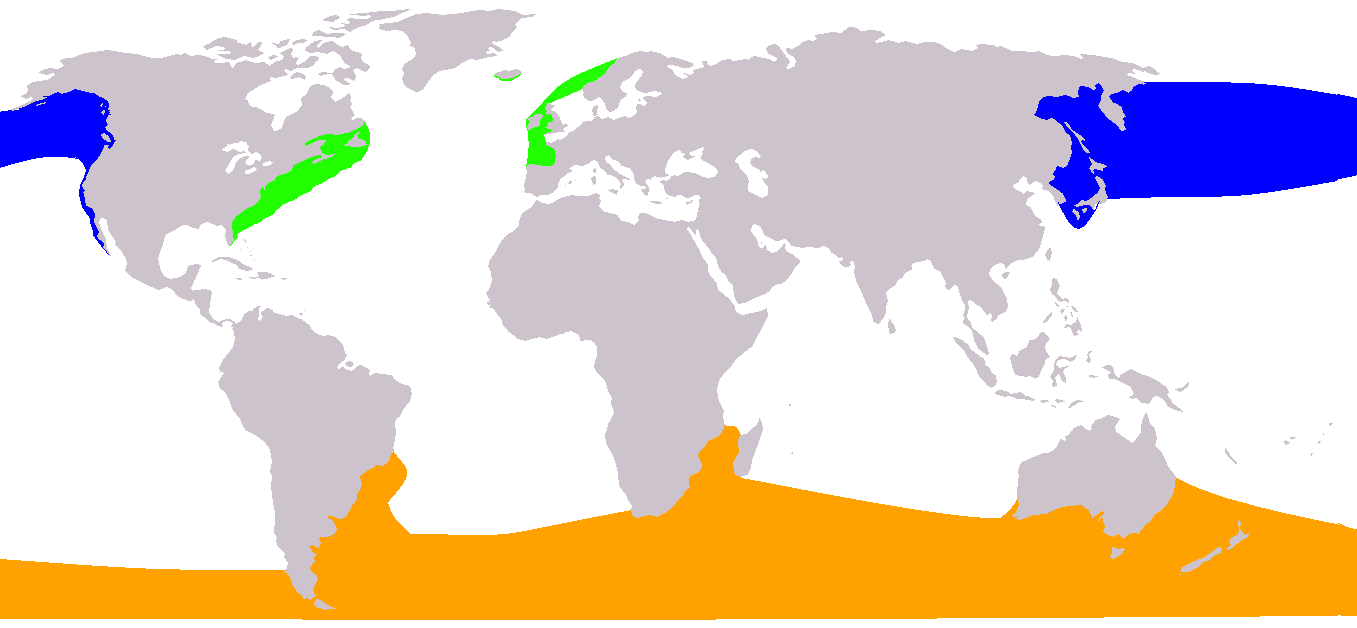
- Range map of Eubalaena species: E. glacialis E. australis E. japonica

Synonyms
- Baloena Robineau, 1989; Halibalaena Gray, 1873; Hunterius Gray, 1866; Hunterus Gray, 1864; Macleayanus Marschall, 1873; Macleayius Gray, 1865

= Right whale =

Right whales Temporal range: Late Miocene – Recent

Three species of large baleen whales of the genus Eubalaena

Right whales are three species of large baleen whales of the genus Eubalaena: the North Atlantic right whale (E. glacialis), the North Pacific right whale (E. japonica) and the southern right whale (E. australis). They are classified in the family Balaenidae with the bowhead whale. Right whales have rotund bodies with arching rostrums, V-shaped blowholes and dark gray or black skin. The most distinguishing feature of a right whale is the rough patches of skin on its head, which appear white due to parasitism by whale lice. Right whales are typically 13–17 m (43–56 ft) long and weigh up to 100 short tons (91 t; 89 long tons) or more.

All three species are migratory, moving seasonally to feed or give birth. The warm equatorial waters form a barrier that isolates the northern and southern species from one another although the southern species, at least, has been known to cross the equator. In the Northern Hemisphere, right whales tend to avoid open waters and stay close to peninsulas and bays and on continental shelves, as these areas offer greater shelter and an abundance of their preferred foods. In the Southern Hemisphere, right whales feed far offshore in summer, but a large portion of the population occur in near-shore waters in winter. Right whales feed mainly on copepods but also consume krill and pteropods. They may forage the surface, underwater or even the ocean bottom. During courtship, males gather into large groups to compete for a single female, suggesting that sperm competition is an important factor in mating behavior. Gestation tends to last a year, and calves are weaned at eight months old.

Right whales were a preferred target for whalers because of their docile nature, their slow surface-skimming feeding behaviors, their tendency to stay close to the coast, and their high blubber content (which makes them float when they are killed and which produced high yields of whale oil). Although the whales no longer face pressure from commercial whaling, humans remain by far the greatest threat to these species: the two leading causes of death are being struck by ships and entanglement in fishing gear. Today, the North Atlantic and North Pacific right whales are among the most endangered whales in the world.

== Etymology ==
A common explanation for the name right whales is that they were regarded as the right ones to hunt, as they float when killed and often swim within sight of shore. They are quite docile and do not tend to shy away from approaching boats. As a result, they were hunted nearly to extinction during the active years of the whaling industry. However, this origin is questionable: in his history of American whaling, Eric Jay Dolin writes:

Despite this highly plausible rationale, nobody actually knows how the right whale got its name. The earliest references to the right whale offer no indication why it was called that, and some who have studied the issue point out that the word "right" in this context might just as likely be intended "to connote 'true' or 'proper,' meaning typical of the group."

— E.J. Dolin, Leviathan: The History of Whaling in America, quoting a 1766 Connecticut Courant newspaper article.

For the scientific names, the generic name Eubalaena means "good or true whales", and specific names include glacialis ("ice") for North Atlantic species, australis ("southern") for Southern Hemisphere species, and japonica ("Japanese") for North Pacific species.

== Taxonomy ==
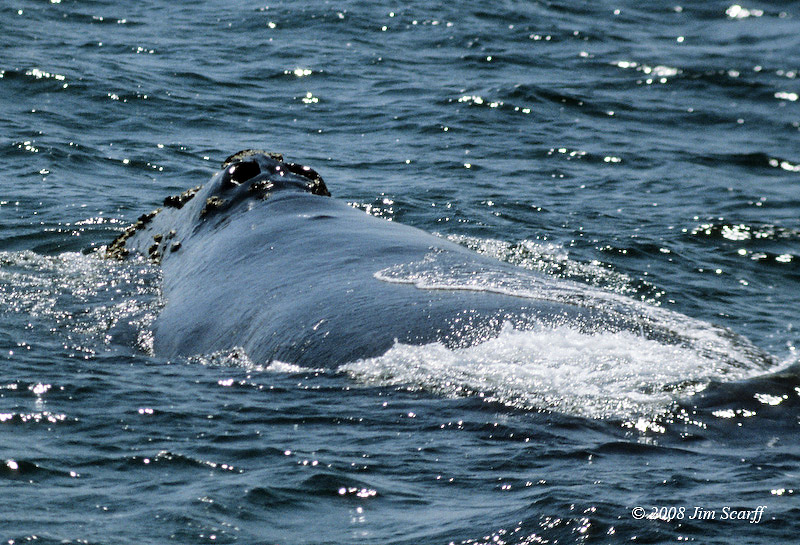
North Pacific right whale in Half Moon Bay, California, 20 March 1982, photo by Jim Scarff

The right whales were first classified in the genus Balaena in 1758 by Carl Linnaeus, who at the time considered all of the right whales (including the bowhead) as a single species. Through the 19th and 20th centuries, in fact, the family Balaenidae has been the subject of great taxonometric debate. Authorities have repeatedly recategorized the three populations of right whale plus the bowhead whale, as one, two, three or four species, either in a single genus or in two separate genera. In the early whaling days, they were all thought to be a single species: Balaena mysticetus. Eventually, it was recognized that bowheads and right whales were in fact different, and John Edward Gray proposed the genus Eubalaena for the right whale in 1864. Later, morphological factors such as differences in the skull shape of northern and southern right whales indicated at least two species of right whale – one in the Northern Hemisphere, the other in the Southern Ocean. As recently as 1998, Rice, in his comprehensive and otherwise authoritative classification listed just two species: Balaena glacialis (the right whales) and Balaena mysticetus (the bowheads).

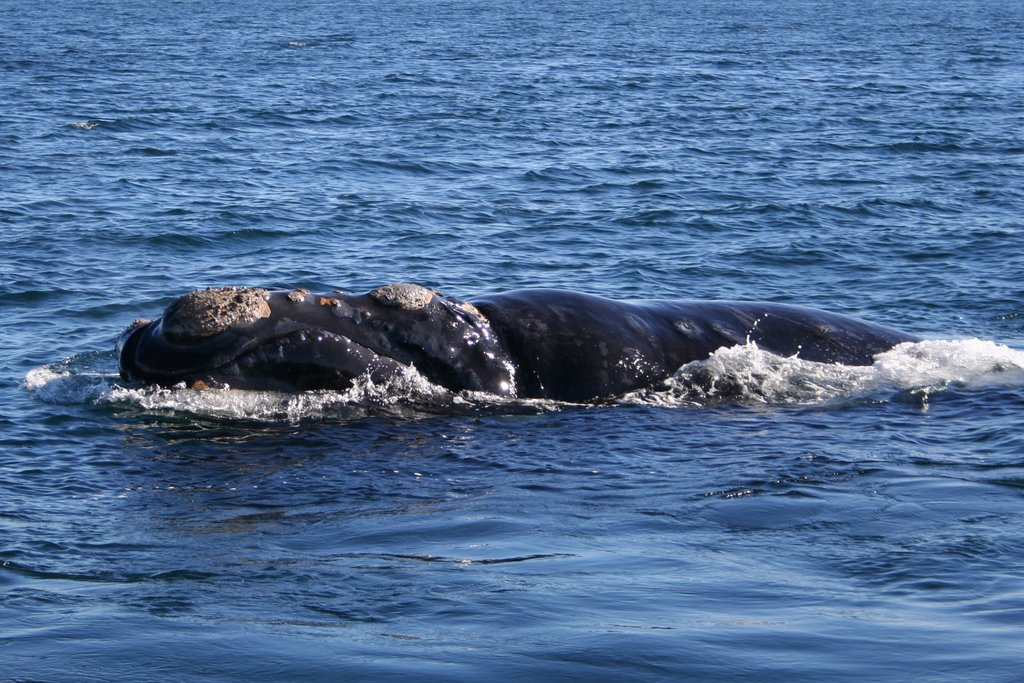
Southern right whale in the breeding grounds at Peninsula Valdés, Patagonia

In 2000, two studies of DNA samples from each of the whale populations concluded that the northern and southern populations of right whale should be considered separate species. What some scientists found more surprising was the discovery that the North Pacific and North Atlantic populations are also distinct, and that the North Pacific species is more closely related to the southern right whale than to the North Atlantic right whale. The authors of one of these studies concluded that these species have not interbred for between 3 million and 12 million years.

In 2001, Brownell et al. reevaluated the conservation status of the North Pacific right whale as a distinct species, and in 2002, the Scientific Committee of the International Whaling Commission (IWC) accepted Rosenbaum's findings, and recommended that the Eubalaena nomenclature be retained for this genus.

A 2007 study by Churchill provided further evidence to conclude that the three different living right whale species constitute a distinct phylogenetic lineage from the bowhead, and properly belong to a separate genus.

The following cladogram of the family Balaenidae serves to illustrate the current scientific consensus as to the relationships between the three right whales and the bowhead whale.

Family Balaenidae

- Balaenidae
  - Eubalaena (right whales)
    - E. glacialis (North Atlantic right whale)
    - - E. japonica (North Pacific right whale)
      - E. australis (Southern right whale)
  - Balaena (bowhead whales)
    B. mysticetus bowhead whale

The right whales, genus Eubalaena, in the family Balaenidae

A cladogram is a tool for visualizing and comparing the evolutionary relationships between taxa; the point where each node branches is analogous to an evolutionary branching – the diagram can be read left-to-right, much like a timeline.

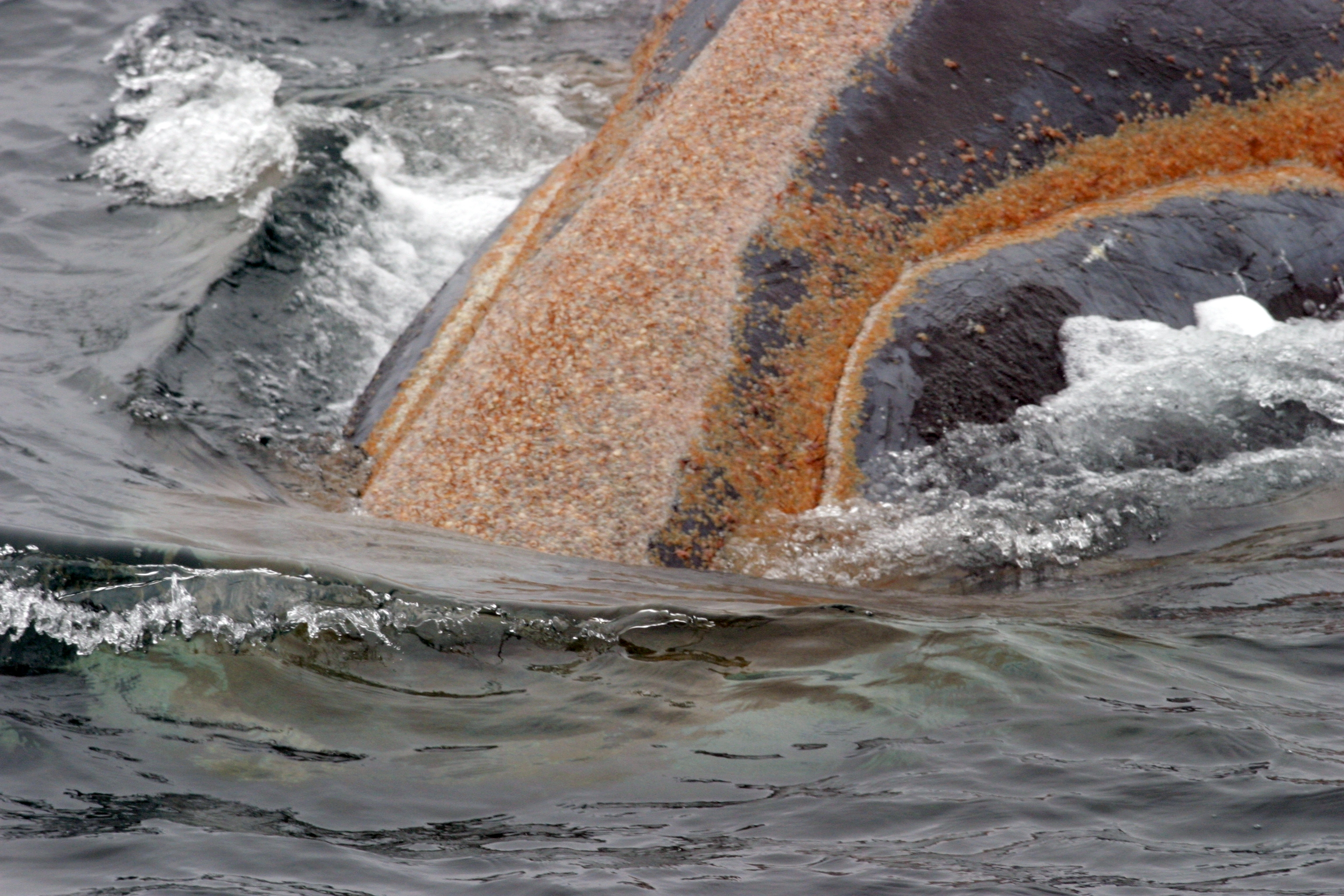
Orange whale lice on a right whale

Whale lice, parasitic cyamid crustaceans that live off skin debris, offer further information through their own genetics. Because these lice reproduce much more quickly than whales, their genetic diversity is greater. Marine biologists at the University of Utah examined these louse genes and determined their hosts split into three species 5–6 million years ago, and these species were all equally abundant before whaling began in the 11th century. The communities first split because of the joining of North and South America. The rising temperatures of the equator then created a second split, into northern and southern groups, preventing them from interbreeding. "This puts an end to the long debate about whether there are three Eubalaena species of right whale. They really are separate beyond a doubt", Jon Seger, the project's leader, told BBC News.

=== Others ===
The pygmy right whale (Caperea marginata), a much smaller whale of the Southern Hemisphere, was until recently considered a member of the Family Balaenidae. However, they are not right whales at all, and their taxonomy is presently in doubt. Most recent authors place this species into the monotypic Family Neobalaenidae, but a 2012 study suggests that it is instead the last living member of the Family Cetotheriidae, a family previously considered extinct.

Yet another species of right whale was proposed by Emanuel Swedenborg in the 18th century—the so-called Swedenborg whale. The description of this species was based on a collection of fossil bones unearthed at Norra Vånga, Sweden, in 1705 and believed to be those of giants. The bones were examined by Swedenborg, who realized they belong to a species of whale. The existence of this species has been debated, and further evidence for this species was discovered during the construction of a motorway in Strömstad, Sweden in 2009. To date, however, scientific consensus still considers Hunterius swedenborgii to be a North Atlantic right whale. According to a DNA analysis conducted, it was later confirmed that the fossil bones are actually from a bowhead whale.

== Characteristics ==
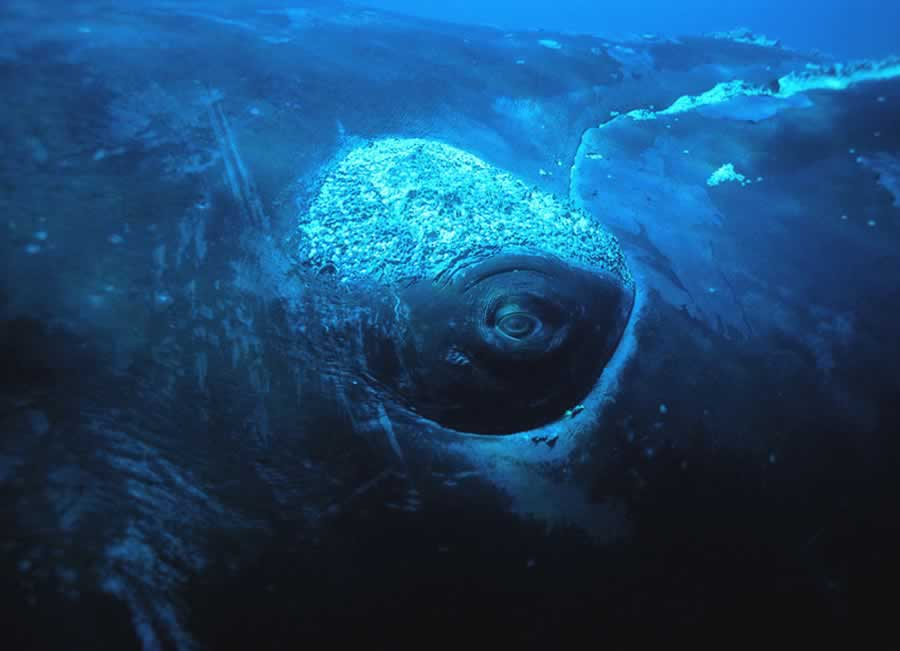
Right whale eye

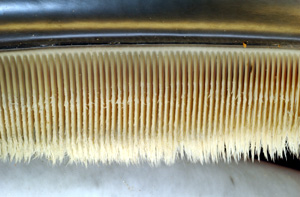
An example of baleen plates; there are about 50 plates in this photo.

Adult right whales are typically 13–16 m (43–52 ft) long. They have extremely thick bodies with a girth as much as 60% of total body length in some cases. They have large, broad and blunt pectoral flippers and the deeply notched, smoothly tipped tail flukes make up to 40% of their body length. The North Pacific species is on average the largest of the three species, weighing 100 short tons (91 t; 89 long tons). The upper jaw of a right whale is a bit arched, and the lower lip is strongly curved. On each side of the upper jaw are 200–270 baleen plates. These are narrow and approximately 2–2.8 m (6.6–9.2 ft) long, and are covered in very thin hairs. Right whales have a distinctive wide V-shaped blow, caused by the widely spaced blowholes on the top of the head. The blow rises 5 m (16 ft) above the surface.

The skin is generally black with occasional white blotches on the body, while some individuals have mottled patterns. Unlike other whales, a right whale has distinctive callosities (roughened patches of skin) on its head. The callosities appear white due to large colonies of cyamids (whale lice). Each individual has a unique callosities pattern. In 2016, a competitive effort resulted in the use of facial recognition software to derive a process to uniquely identify right whales with about 87% accuracy based on their callosities. The primary role of callosities has been considered to be protection against predators. Right whale declines might have also reduced barnacles.

An unusually large 40% of their body weight is blubber, which is of relatively low density. Consequently, unlike many other species of whale, dead right whales tend to float. Many southern right whales are seen with rolls of fats behind blowholes that northern species often lack, and these are regarded as a sign of better health condition due to sufficient nutrition supply, and could have contributed in vast differences in recovery status between right whales in the southern and northern hemisphere, other than direct impacts by humankind.

The penis on a right whale can be up to 2.7 m (8.9 ft) – the testes, at up to 2 m (6.6 ft) in length, 78 cm (2.56 ft) in diameter, and weighing up to 525 kg (1157 lbs), are also by far the largest of any animal on Earth. The blue whale may be the largest animal on the planet, yet the testicles of the right whale are ten times the size of those of the blue whale. They also exceed predictions in terms of relative size, being six times larger than would be expected on the basis of body mass. Together, the testicles make up nearly 1% of the right whale's total body weight. This strongly suggests sperm competition is important in mating, which correlates to the fact that right whales are highly promiscuous.

== Range and habitat ==
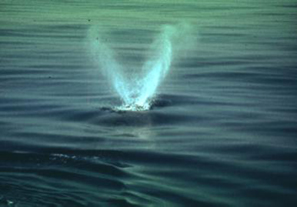
The distinctive V-shaped blow of a right whale

The three Eubalaena species inhabit three distinct areas of the globe: the North Atlantic in the western Atlantic Ocean, the North Pacific in a band from Japan to Alaska and all areas of the Southern Ocean. The whales can only cope with the moderate temperatures found between 20 and 60 degrees in latitude. The warm equatorial waters form a barrier that prevents mixing between the northern and southern groups with minor exclusions. Although the southern species in particular must travel across open ocean to reach its feeding grounds, the species is not considered to be pelagic. In general, they prefer to stay close to peninsulas and bays and on continental shelves, as these areas offer greater shelter and an abundance of their preferred foods.

Because the oceans are so large, it is very difficult to accurately gauge whale population sizes. Approximate figures:

- 400 North Atlantic right whales (Eubalaena glacialis) live in the North Atlantic;
- 23 North Pacific right whales have been identified in the eastern North Pacific (Eubalaena japonica) and
- 15,000 southern right whales (Eubalaena australis) are spread throughout the southern part of the Southern Hemisphere.

=== North Atlantic right whale ===
Almost all of the 400 North Atlantic right whales live in the western North Atlantic Ocean. In northern spring, summer and autumn, they feed in areas off the Canadian and northeast U.S. coasts in a range stretching from New York to Newfoundland. Particularly popular feeding areas are the Bay of Fundy and Cape Cod Bay. In winter, they head south towards Georgia and Florida to give birth. There have been a smattering of sightings further east over the past few decades; several sightings were made close to Iceland in 2003. These are possibly the remains of a virtually extinct eastern Atlantic stock, but examination of old whalers' records suggests they are more likely to be strays. However, a few sightings have happened between Norway, Ireland, Spain, Portugal, the Canary Islands and Italy; at least the Norway individuals come from the Western stock.

=== North Pacific right whale ===
The North Pacific right whale appears to occur in two populations. The population in the eastern North Pacific/Bering Sea is extremely low, numbering about 30 individuals. A larger western population of 100–200 appears to be surviving in the Sea of Okhotsk, but very little is known about this population. Thus, the two northern right whale species are the most endangered of all large whales and two of the most endangered animal species in the world. Based on current population density trends, both species are predicted to become extinct within 200 years. The Pacific species was historically found in summer from the Sea of Okhotsk in the west to the Gulf of Alaska in the east, generally north of 50°N. Today, sightings are very rare and generally occur in the mouth of the Sea of Okhotsk and in the eastern Bering Sea. Although this species is very likely to be migratory like the other two species, its movement patterns are not known.

=== Southern right whale ===
The last major population review of southern right whales by the International Whaling Commission was in 1998. Researchers used data about adult female populations from three surveys (one in each of Argentina, South Africa and Australia) and extrapolated to include unsurveyed areas and estimated counts of males and calves (using available male:female and adult:calf ratios), giving an estimated 1997 population of 7,500 animals. More recent data from 2007 indicate those survey areas have shown evidence of strong recovery, with a population approaching twice that of a decade earlier. However, other breeding populations are still very small, and data are insufficient to determine whether they, too, are recovering.

The southern right whale spends the summer months in the far Southern Ocean feeding, probably close to Antarctica. It migrates north in winter for breeding, and can be seen around the coasts of Argentina, Australia, Brazil, Chile, Mozambique, New Zealand, South Africa and Uruguay. The South American, South African and Australasian groups apparently intermix very little, if at all, because of the strong fidelity of mothers to their feeding and calving grounds. The mother passes these instincts to her calves.

== Life history ==
Right whales swim slowly, reaching only 5 kn (9.3 km/h) at top speed. However, they are highly acrobatic and frequently breach (jump clear of the sea surface), tail-slap and lobtail.

=== Diet and predation ===
The right whales' diets consist primarily of zooplankton, primarily the tiny crustaceans called copepods, as well as krill, and pteropods, although they are occasionally opportunistic feeders. As with other baleens, they feed by filtering prey from the water. They swim with an open mouth, filling it with water and prey. The whale then expels the water, using its baleen plates to retain the prey. Prey must occur in sufficient numbers to trigger the whale's interest, be large enough that the baleen plates can filter it, and be slow enough that it cannot escape. The "skimming" may take place on the surface, underwater, or even at the seabed, indicated by mud occasionally observed on right whales' bodies.

The right whales' two known predators are humans and orcas. When danger lurks, a group of right whales may cluster into a circle, and thrash their outwards-pointing tails. They may also head for shallow water, which sometimes proves to be an ineffective defense. Aside from the strong tails and massive heads equipped with callosities, the sheer size of this animal is its best defense, making young calves the most vulnerable to orca and shark attacks.

=== Vocalization and hearing ===
Vocalizations made by right whales are not elaborate compared to those made by other whale species. The whales make groans, pops and belches typically at frequencies around 500 Hz. The purpose of the sounds is not known but may be a form of communication between whales within the same group. Northern right whales responded to sounds similar to police sirens—sounds of much higher frequency than their own. On hearing the sounds, they moved rapidly to the surface. The research was of particular interest because northern rights ignore most sounds, including those of approaching boats. Researchers speculate this information may be useful in attempts to reduce the number of ship-whale collisions or to encourage the whales to surface for ease of harvesting.

=== Courtship and reproduction ===
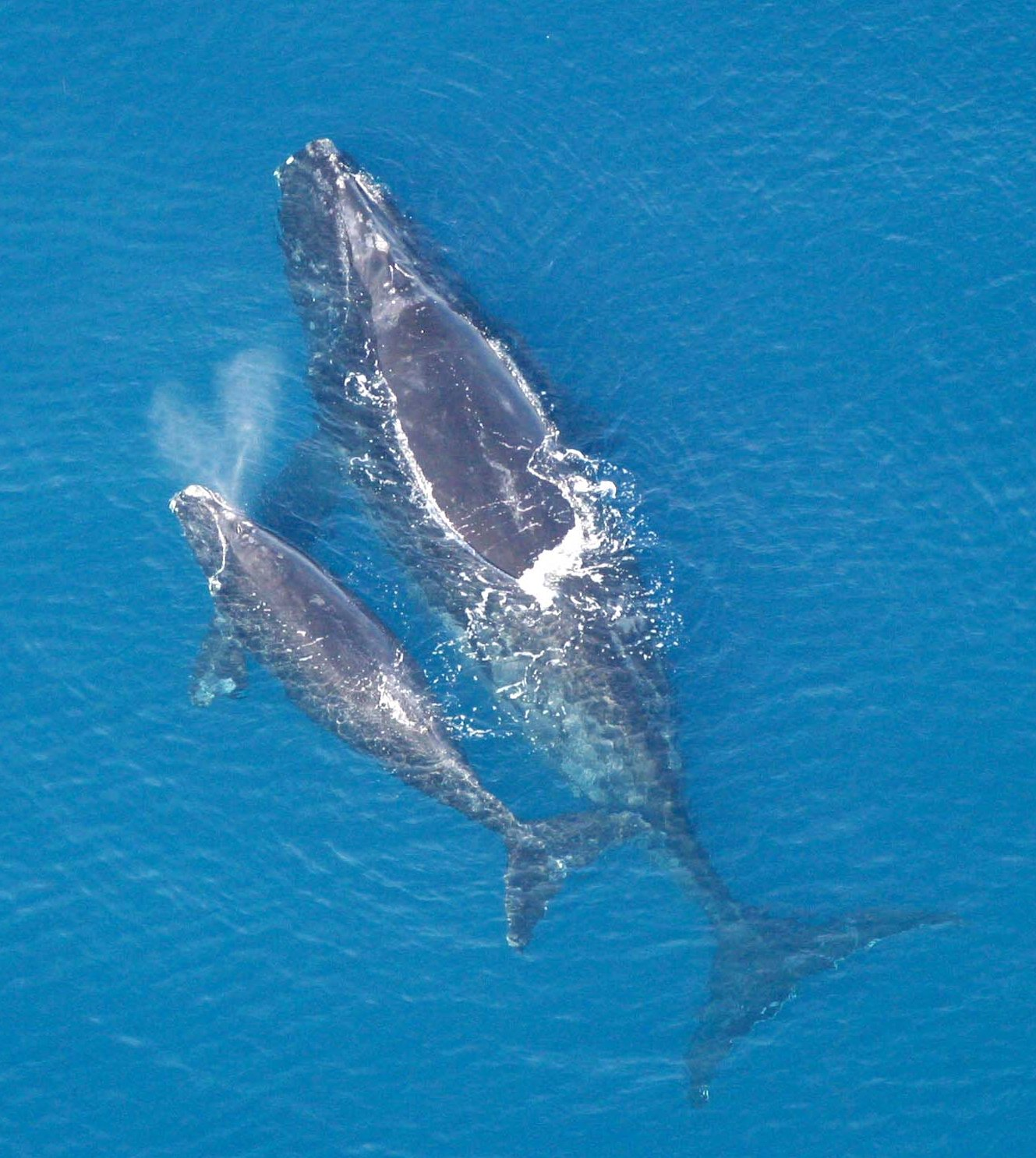
A female North Atlantic right whale with her calf.

During the mating season, which can occur at any time in the North Atlantic, right whales gather into "surface-active groups" made up of as many as 20 males consorting a single female. The female has her belly to the surface while the males stroke her with their flippers or keep her underwater. The males do not compete as aggressively against each other as male humpbacks. The female may not become pregnant but she is still able to assess the condition of potential mates. The mean age of first parturition in North Atlantic right whales is estimated at between 7.5 and 9 years. Females breed every 3–5 years; the most commonly seen calving intervals are 3 years and may vary from 2 up to 21 years due to multiple factors.

Both reproduction and calving take place during the winter months. Calves are approximately 1 short ton (0.91 t; 0.89 long tons) in weight and 4–6 m (13–20 ft) in length at birth following a gestation period of 1 year. The right whale grows rapidly in its first year, typically doubling in length. Weaning occurs after eight months to one year and the growth rate in later years is not well understood—it may be highly dependent on whether a calf stays with its mother for a second year.

Respective congregation areas in the same region may function as for different objectives for whales.

=== Lifespan ===
Very little is known about the life span of right whales. One of the few well-documented cases is of a female North Atlantic right whale that was photographed with a baby in 1935, then photographed again in 1959, 1980, 1985, and 1992. Consistent callosity patterns ensured it was the same animal. She was last photographed in 1995 with a seemingly fatal head wound, presumably from a ship strike. By conservative estimates (e.g. she was a new mother who had just reached sexual maturity in 1935), she was nearly 70 years to more than 100 years of age, if not older. Research on the closely related bowhead whale exceeding 210 years suggests this lifespan is not uncommon and may even be exceeded.

== Relationship to humans ==
=== Whaling ===
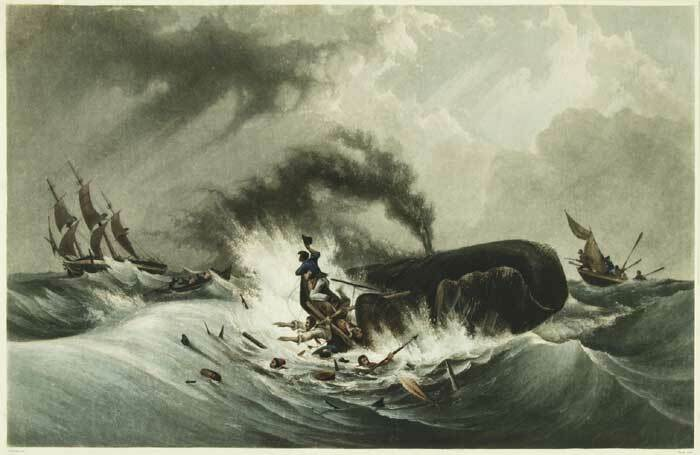
Whaling in small wooden boats with hand harpoons was a hazardous enterprise, even when hunting the "right" whale.

In the early centuries of shore-based whaling before 1712, right whales were virtually the only catchable large whales, for three reasons:

- They often swam close to shore where they could be spotted by beach lookouts, and hunted from beach-based whaleboats.
- They are relatively slow swimmers, allowing whalers to catch up to them in their whaleboats.
- Once killed by harpoons, they were more likely to float, and thus could be retrieved. However, some did sink when killed (10–30% in the North Pacific) and were lost unless they later stranded or surfaced.

Basque people were the first to hunt right whales commercially, beginning as early as the 11th century in the Bay of Biscay. They initially sought oil, but as meat preservation technology improved, the animal was also used for food. Basque whalers reached eastern Canada by 1530 and the shores of Todos os Santos Bay (in Bahia, Brazil) by 1602. The last Basque voyages were made before the Seven Years' War (1756–1763). All attempts to revive the trade after the war failed. Basque shore whaling continued sporadically into the 19th century.

"Yankee whalers" from the new American colonies replaced the Basques. Setting out from Nantucket, Massachusetts, and Long Island, New York, they took up to a hundred animals in good years. By 1750, the commercial hunt of the North Atlantic right whale was essentially over. The Yankee whalers moved into the South Atlantic before the end of the 18th century. The southernmost Brazilian whaling station was established in 1796, in Imbituba. Over the next hundred years, Yankee whaling spread into the Southern and Pacific Oceans, where the Americans were joined by fleets from several European nations. The beginning of the 20th century saw much greater industrialization of whaling, and the harvest grew rapidly. According to whalers' records, by 1937 there had been 38,000 takes in the South Atlantic, 39,000 in the South Pacific, 1,300 in the Indian Ocean, and 15,000 in the North Pacific. The incompleteness of these records means the actual take was somewhat higher.

As it became clear the stocks were nearly depleted, the world banned right whaling in 1937. The ban was largely successful, although violations continued for several decades. Madeira took its last two right whales in 1968. Japan took twenty-three Pacific right whales in the 1940s and more under scientific permit in the 1960s. Illegal whaling continued off the coast of Brazil for many years, and the Imbituba land station processed right whales until 1973. The Soviet Union illegally took at least 3,212 southern right whales during the 1950s and '60s, although it reported taking only four.

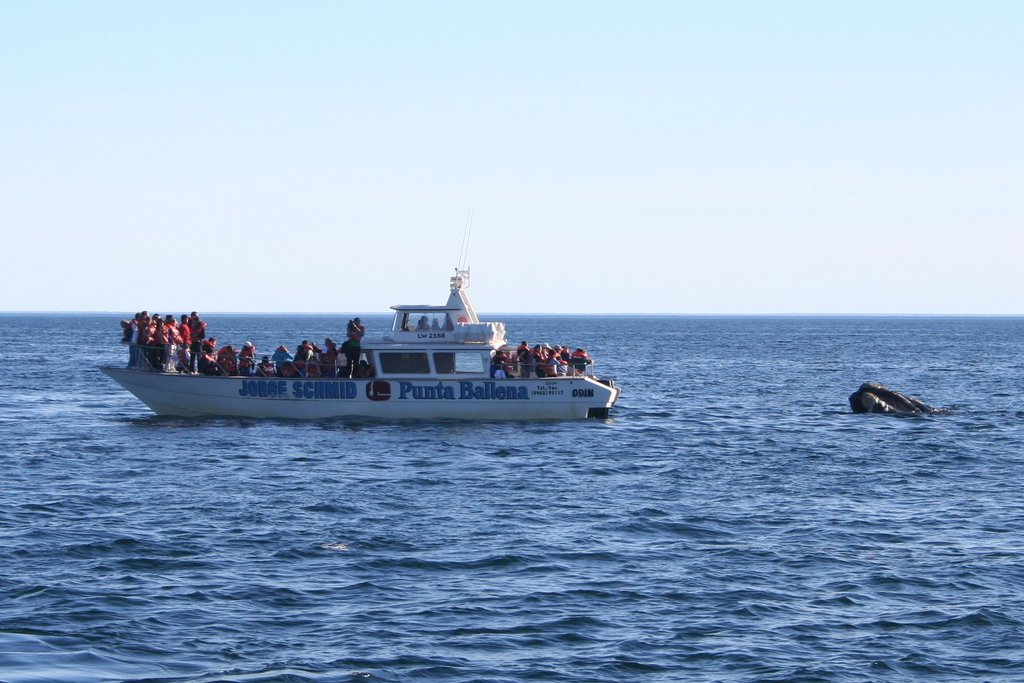
A southern right whale approaches close to whale watchers near Península Valdés in Patagonia

=== Whale watching ===
The southern right whale has made Hermanus, South Africa, one of the world centers for whale watching. During the winter months (July–October), southern right whales come so close to the shoreline, visitors can watch whales from strategically placed hotels. The town employs a "whale crier" (cf. town crier) to walk through the town announcing where whales have been seen. In Brazil, Imbituba in Santa Catarina has been recognized as the National Right Whale Capital and holds annual Right Whale Week celebrations in September when mothers and calves are more often seen. The old whaling station there has been converted to a museum dedicated to the whales. In winter in Argentina, Península Valdés in Patagonia hosts the largest breeding population of the species, with more than 2,000 animals catalogued by the Whale Conservation Institute and Ocean Alliance.

== Conservation ==
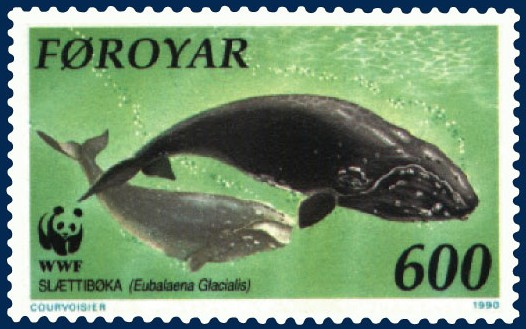
North Atlantic right whale on a Faroese stamp

Both the North Atlantic and North Pacific species are listed as a "species threatened with extinction which [is] or may be affected by trade" (Appendix I) by CITES, and as "endangered" by the IUCN Red List. In the United States, the National Marine Fisheries Service (NMFS), a subagency of the National Oceanic and Atmospheric Administration (NOAA) has classified all three species as "endangered" under the Endangered Species Act. Under the Marine Mammal Protection Act, they are listed as "depleted".

The southern right whale is listed as "endangered" under the Australian Environment Protection and Biodiversity Conservation Act, as "nationally endangered" under the New Zealand Threat Classification System, as a "natural monument" by the Argentine National Congress, and as a "State Natural Monument" under the Brazilian National Endangered Species List.

The U.S. and Brazil added new protections for right whales in the 2000s to address the two primary hazards. While environmental campaigners were, as reported in 2001, pleased about the plan's positive effects, they attempted to force the US government to do more. In particular, they advocated 12 knots (22 km/h) speed limits for ships within 40 km (25 mi) of US ports in times of high right whale presence. Citing concerns about excessive trade disruption, it did not institute greater protections. The Defenders of Wildlife, the Humane Society of the United States and the Ocean Conservancy sued the NMFS in September 2005 for "failing to protect the critically endangered North Atlantic Right Whale, which the agency acknowledges is 'the rarest of all large whale species' and which federal agencies are required to protect by both the Marine Mammal Protection Act and the Endangered Species Act", demanding emergency protection measures.

The southern right whale, listed as "endangered" by CITES and "lower risk - conservation dependent" by the IUCN, is protected in the jurisdictional waters of all countries with known breeding populations (Argentina, Australia, Brazil, Chile, New Zealand, South Africa and Uruguay). In Brazil, a federal Environmental Protection Area encompassing some 1,560 km^{2} (600 sq mi) and 130 km (81 mi) of coastline in Santa Catarina State was established in 2000 to protect the species' main breeding grounds in Brazil and promote whale watching.

On February 6, 2006, NOAA proposed its Strategy to Reduce Ship Strikes to North Atlantic Right Whales. The proposal, opposed by some shipping interests, limited ship speeds during calving season. The proposal was made official when on December 8, 2008, NOAA issued a press release that included the following:

- Effective January 2009, ships 65 feet (20 m) or longer are limited to 10 knots (19 km/h) in waters off New England when whales begin gathering in this area as part of their annual migration. The restriction extends to 20 nautical miles (37 km) around major mid-Atlantic ports.
- The speed restriction applies in waters off New England and the southeastern US, where whales gather seasonally:
  - Southeastern US from St. Augustine, Florida to Brunswick, Georgia from Nov 15 to April 15
  - Mid-Atlantic U.S. areas from Rhode Island to Georgia from Nov 1 to April 30.
  - Cape Cod Bay from Jan 1 to May 15
  - Off Race Point at the northern end of Cape Cod from March 1 to April 30
  - Great South Channel of New England from April 1 to July 31
- Temporary voluntary speed limits in other areas or times when a group of three or more right whales is confirmed
- Scientists would assess the rule's effectiveness before the rule expires in 2013.

In 2020, NOAA published its assessment and found that since the speed rule was adopted, the total number of documented deaths from vessel strike decreased but serious and non-serious injuries have increased. A report by the organization Oceana found that between 2017 and 2020, disobedience of the rule reached close to 90% in mandatory speed zones while in voluntary areas, disobedience neared 85%.

=== Threats ===
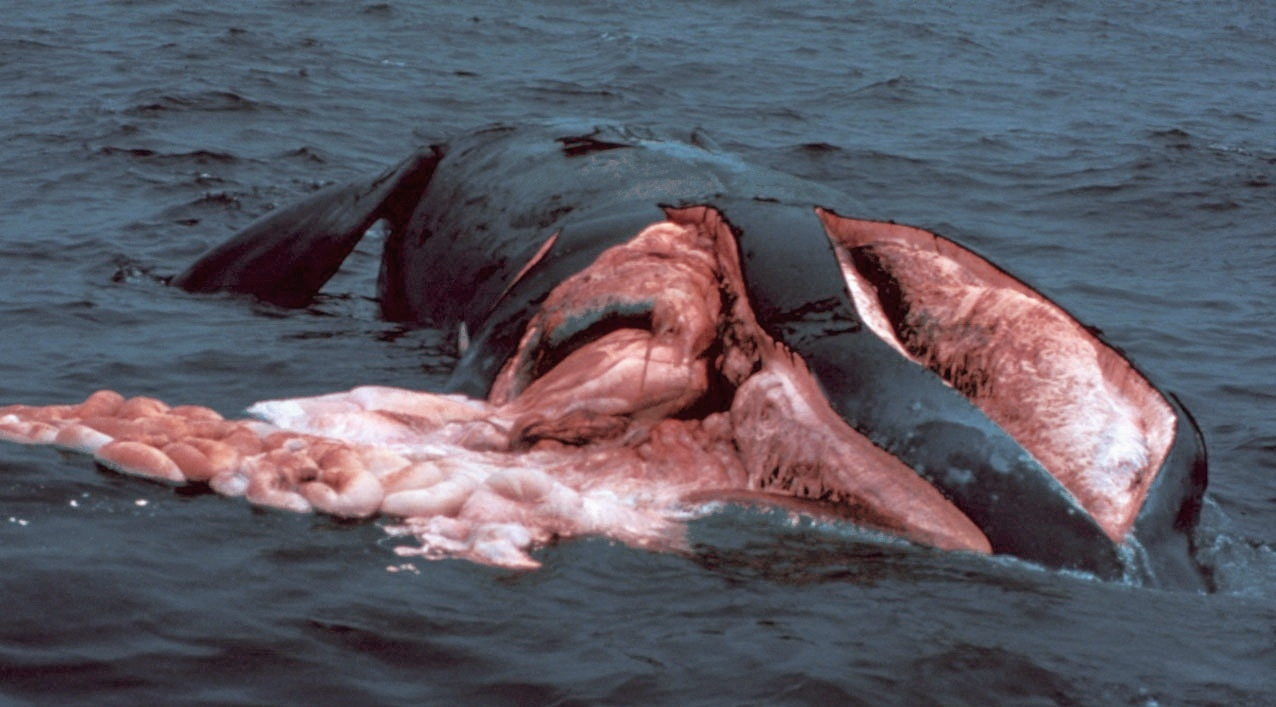
The remains of a North Atlantic right whale after it collided with a ship propeller

The leading cause of death among the North Atlantic right whale, which migrates through some of the world's busiest shipping lanes while journeying off the east coast of the United States and Canada, is being struck by ships. (Note: The Lloyd's mirror effect results in low frequency propeller sounds not being discernible near the surface, where most accidents occur. Combined with spreading and acoustic shadowing effects, the result is that the animal is unable to hear an approaching vessel before it has been run over or entrapped by the hydrodynamic forces of the vessel's passage.) At least sixteen ship-strike deaths were reported between 1970 and 1999, and probably more remain unreported. According to NOAA, twenty-five of the seventy-one right whale deaths reported since 1970 resulted from ship strikes.

A second major cause of morbidity and mortality in the North Atlantic right whale is entanglement in plastic fishing gear. Right whales ingest plankton with wide-open mouths, risking entanglement in any rope or net fixed in the water column. Rope wraps around their upper jaws, flippers and tails. Some are able to escape, but others remain tangled. Whales can be successfully disentangled, if observed and aided. In July 1997, the U.S. NOAA introduced the Atlantic Large Whale Take Reduction Plan, which seeks to minimize whale entanglement in fishing gear and record large whale sightings in an attempt to estimate numbers and distribution.

In 2012, the U.S. Navy proposed to create a new undersea naval training range immediately adjacent to northern right whale calving grounds in shallow waters off the Florida/Georgia border. Legal challenges by leading environmental groups including the Natural Resources Defense Council were denied in federal court, allowing the Navy to proceed. These rulings were made despite the extremely low numbers (as low as 313 by some estimates) of right whales in existence at this time, and a very poor calving season.
