= Neocyamus =

Scientific classification
- Domain: Eukaryota
- Kingdom: Animalia
- Phylum: Arthropoda
- Class: Malacostraca
- Order: Amphipoda
- Family: Cyamidae
- Subfamily: Isocyaminae
- Genus: Neocyamus; Margolis, 1955
- Species: N. physeteris

Binomial name
- Neocyamus physeteris (Pouchet, 1888)

Genus of crustaceans

Neocyamus is a monotypic genus of amphipod belonging to the family Cyamidae. The only species is Neocyamus physeteris.
