= Oruaiti =

- Interactive map of Oruaiti
- Coordinates: 35°0′12″S 173°35′20″E
- Country: New Zealand
- Region: Northland Region
- District: Far North District
- Ward: Te Hiku
- Community: Te Hiku
- Subdivision: Doubtless Bay
- Electorates: Northland; Te Tai Tokerau

Government
  - Territorial Authority: Far North District Council
  - Regional council: Northland Regional Council
  - Mayor of Far North: Moko Tepania
  - Northland MP: Grant McCallum
  - Te Tai Tokerau MP: TBD

Oruaiti is a locality in Northland, New Zealand. It lies on State Highway 10. Mangonui lies to the west, and Whangaroa Harbour to the east.

The New Zealand Ministry for Culture and Heritage gives a translation of "place of [a] small pit" for Ōruaiti.

== Demographics ==
The Taemaro-Oruaiti statistical area, which also includes Hihi and Taemārō, covers 156.80 km^{2} (60.54 sq mi) and had an estimated population of 1,130 as of June 2025, with a population density of 7.2 people per km^{2}.

Historical population
Year	Pop.	±% p.a.
2006	729	—
2013	666	−1.28%
2018	867	+5.42%
2023	1,101	+4.89%

Taemaro-Oruaiti had a population of 1,101 in the 2023 New Zealand census, an increase of 234 people (27.0%) since the 2018 census, and an increase of 435 people (65.3%) since the 2013 census. There were 558 males and 543 females in 411 dwellings. 1.9% of people identified as LGBTIQ+. The median age was 51.5 years (compared with 38.1 years nationally). There were 192 people (17.4%) aged under 15 years, 144 (13.1%) aged 15 to 29, 507 (46.0%) aged 30 to 64, and 258 (23.4%) aged 65 or older.

People could identify as more than one ethnicity. The results were 71.9% European (Pākehā), 44.4% Māori, 4.1% Pasifika, 3.3% Asian, and 3.8% other, which includes people giving their ethnicity as "New Zealander". English was spoken by 98.1%, Māori language by 13.9%, Samoan by 0.3% and other languages by 4.9%. No language could be spoken by 1.6% (e.g. too young to talk). New Zealand Sign Language was known by 0.5%. The percentage of people born overseas was 13.6%, compared with 28.8% nationally.

Religious affiliations were 28.1% Christian, 0.3% Hindu, 0.3% Islam, 2.7% Māori religious beliefs, 0.8% Buddhist, 0.5% New Age, and 1.1% other religions. People who answered that they had no religion were 60.2%, and 6.3% of people did not answer the census question.

Of those at least 15 years old, 102 (11.2%) people had a bachelor's or higher degree, 507 (55.8%) had a post-high school certificate or diploma, and 261 (28.7%) people exclusively held high school qualifications. The median income was $25,400, compared with $41,500 nationally. 48 people (5.3%) earned over $100,000 compared to 12.1% nationally. The employment status of those at least 15 was that 315 (34.7%) people were employed full-time, 141 (15.5%) were part-time, and 33 (3.6%) were unemployed.

== Education ==
Oruaiti School is a coeducational full primary (years 1–8) school with a roll of 162 students as of July 2026. The school started in 1896. In the early 1960s, it became an experimental school under principal Elwyn Richardson.
