= Bones (disambiguation) =

Bones are rigid connective members that make up the skeleton of vertebrates.

Bones or The Bones may also refer to:

== People ==
- Bones (nickname), a list of people
- Bones (rapper), underground rapper
- Bones (surname), a list of people
- Jon "Bones" Jones (born 1987), American mixed martial artist

== Arts, entertainment, and media ==
=== Fictional characters ===
- Bones, a minstrel show character
- Temperance "Bones" Brennan, a character on the television show Bones
- Leonard McCoy or "Bones", a character on Star Trek

=== Films ===
- Bones (2001 film), a horror film
  - Bones (soundtrack)
- Bones (2010 film), a drama film

=== Literature ===
- Bones, a novel by Jan Burke
- Bones, a novel by Chenjerai Hove
- Bones, a novel by Jonathan Kellerman
- Bones, a novella by Pat Murphy
- Bones, a novel series by Edgar Wallace

=== Music ===
==== Albums ====
- Bones (Susan McKeown album), 1996
- Bones (Son Lux album), 2015
- Bones (Young Guns album), 2012

==== Songs ====
- "Bones" (Ginny Blackmore song), 2013
- "Bones" (Editors song), 2008
- "Bones" (Equinox song), 2018
- "Bones" (Galantis song), 2019
- "Bones" (Imagine Dragons song), 2022
- "Bones" (The Killers song), 2006
- "Bones" (Michael Kiwanuka song), 2011
- "Bones" (Soccer Mommy song), 2026
- "Bones" (Young Guns song), 2013
- "Bones", a song by Die Monster Die from Withdrawal Method
- "Bones", a song by Rebecca Ferguson from Superwoman
- "Bones", a song by Demi Lovato from Holy Fvck, 2022
- "Bones", a song by Radiohead from The Bends
- "Bones", a song by Anthony Raneri from Everyday Royalty, 2024
- "Bones", by Telenova, 2021
- "Bones", a song by Joe Walsh from There Goes the Neighborhood
- "The Bones" (song), a song by Maren Morris

==== Other uses in music ====
- Bones (band), an American power pop band
- Bones UK, a rock band from Camden Town, London
- Bones (instrument), a musical instrument

=== Other uses in arts, entertainment, and media ===
- Bones (studio), a Japanese anime studio
- Bones (TV series), an American crime show
- Bones, a slang term for objects used in gaming:
  - Dice
  - Dominoes

== Other uses ==
- The Bones, a mountain peak in Ireland
- Bones (bull), #05 Professional Bull Riders World Champion bucking bull
- Bones Bearings, a brand of skateboard bearings
- "Bones", nickname of HMS Kempenfelt (I18), a Royal Navy destroyer

== See also ==
- Bad Bones, ring name of German professional wrestler John Klinger (born 1984)
- Bone (disambiguation)
- Boner (disambiguation)
- Mr Bones (disambiguation)
