= Uribe (surname) =

Uribe is a Basque surname.

== Geographical distribution ==
As of 2014, 37.1% of all known bearers of the surname Uribe were residents of Mexico (frequency 1:1,373), 26.3% of Colombia (1:747), 10.8% of Chile (1:671), 9.2% of the United States (1:16,102), 3.9% of Peru (1:3,357), 3.8% of Venezuela (1:3,282), 2.3% of the Dominican Republic (1:1,831), 1.8% of Spain (1:10,531), 1.8% of Argentina (1:9,849) and 1.1% of Ecuador (1:6,177).

In Spain, the frequency of the surname was higher than national average (1:10,531) in the following autonomous communities:

1. Basque Country (1:1,743)
2. Cantabria (1:5,949)
3. Balearic Islands (1:7,110)
4. La Rioja (1:7,565)
5. Navarre (1:9,226)

In Chile, the frequency of the surname was higher than national average (1:671) in the following regions:

1. Los Lagos Region (1:128)
2. Aysén Region (1:184)
3. Magallanes Region (1:207)
4. Los Ríos Region (1:238)
5. Bío Bío Region (1:561)

== Notable people ==
- Abner Uribe (born 2000), Dominican baseball player
- Álvaro Uribe (born 1952), President of Colombia 2002–2010
- Álvaro Uribe (Uribe DJ) (born 1973), Colombian radio personality
- Ana Uribe, Colombian muralist and painter
- Ángel Uribe (1943–2008), Peruvian footballer
- Aracely Leuquén Uribe (born 1980), Chilean politician
- Armando Uribe (1933–2020), Chilean writer, poet, lawyer, and diplomat
- Beatriz Elena Uribe Botero, Colombian economist and official
- Brenda Uribe (born 1993), Peruvian volleyball player
- Cenaida Uribe (born 1965), Peruvian former volleyball player and politician
- Cristián Uribe (born 1976), Chilean footballer
- Édson Uribe (born 1982), Peruvian footballer
- Eduardo Uribe (born 1985), Peruvian footballer
- Federico Uribe (born 1962), Colombian artist
- Fernando Uribe (born 1988), Colombian footballer
- Gabriel Ochoa Uribe (1929–2020), Colombian football manager and former player
- George Uribe (born 1968), American television producer
- Guillermina Uribe Bone (1920–2018), civil engineer, first woman to earn a degree in civil engineering from the National University of Colombia in Bogotá
- Guillermo Uribe Holguín (1880–1971), Colombian composer and violinist
- Hector Uribe (born 1946), Texas politician
- Ignacio Uribe (born 1933), Spanish footballer
- Imanol Uribe (born 1950), Spanish screenwriter and film director
- Jorge Alberto Uribe (born 1940), Colombian politician
- José Uribe (1959–2006), Dominican baseball player
- Juan Uribe (born 1979), Dominican baseball player
- Julio César Uribe (born 1958), Peruvian football manager and former player
- Luis Uribe (1847–1914), Chilean admiral
- Kirmen Uribe (born 1970), Basque poet
- Manuel de Lardizábal y Uribe (1744–1820), Mexican penologist
- Manuel Fernando Serrano Uribe (1789–1819), Colombian statesman
- Manuel Uribe Ángel (1822–1904), Colombian physician, geographer, and politician
- Manuel Uribe y Troncoso (1867–1959), Mexican ophthalmologist
- María Cristina Uribe, Colombian journalist and news presenter
- María Teresa Uribe (1940–2019), Colombian sociologist
- Mariajo Uribe (born 1990), Colombian professional golfer
- Mario Montoya Uribe (born 1949), Colombian general
- Mario Uribe Escobar (born 1949), Colombian politician
- Mateus Uribe (born 1991), Colombian footballer
- Miguel Uribe Turbay (1986–2025), Colombian politician
- Rafael Uribe Uribe (1859–1914), Colombian politician and general
- Rebeca Uribe Bone (1917–2017), chemical engineer, first woman to graduate in engineering in Colombia
- Sofía Gómez Uribe (born 1992), Colombian freediver and civil engineer
