= Boner =

Boner may refer to:

== People with the name ==
- Boner (surname)

== Arts, entertainment, and media ==
- Boner Records, a California-based independent label
- Boner Stabone, a recurring character on the TV series Growing Pains
- Boner's Ark, a comic strip about a sailing ship filled with animals

== Other uses ==
- Boner, a slang term for an erection
- Boner, a slang term for an error
- Boner, a United States Department of Agriculture carcass grade for slaughter cattle

== See also ==
- Blooper (disambiguation)
- Blunder (disambiguation)
- Bonar (disambiguation)
- Bone (disambiguation)
- Bones (disambiguation)
