= Manuel Uribe Troncoso =

Mexican ophthalmologist (1867–1959)

Manuel Uribe Troncoso (Note: In this Spanish name, the first or paternal surname is Uribe and the second or maternal family name is Troncoso. The surnames are also given as "Uribe y Troncoso", with the coordinating conjunction y ("and").) (17 June 1867 – 21 January 1959) was a Mexican ophthalmologist.

Manuel Uribe Troncoso was born in Toluca, State of Mexico, on 17 June 1867. He graduated with a degree in medicine from the National University of Mexico (UNM). A joint founder of the Mexican Ophthalmology Society, he was a renowned expert on the physiology and diseases of the eye. In 1943 President Manuel Ávila Camacho appointed him one of the founding members of the Colegio Nacional.

Uribe Troncoso died in New York City, United States, on 21 January 1959.

== Inventions ==
- A monocular self-illuminating gonioscope
- A binocular corneal microscope
- A "Demonstration Eye" for refraction anomalies

== Publications ==
- Por tierras mejicanas (1919)
- Internal Diseases of the Eye and Atlas of Ophthalmoscopy (1937)
- A Treatise of Gonioscopy (1947)
