= Game of Bones =

Game of Bones may refer to:

- Bunnock, a Russian game involving horse anklebones
- Dominoes, in which the pieces are called bones
- Dice games, in which the dice are called bones
- A Game of Bones, novel by David Donachie, part of The Privateersman Mysteries series
- "Game of Bones", an episode of the reality television cooking competition Kitchen Casino
- "Game of Bones", an episode of the children's television series Mutt & Stuff
- Game of Bones: Winter Is Cumming, a pornographic film parody by Lee Roy Myers

== See also ==
- Bone (disambiguation)
- Knucklebones, a.k.a. jacks
