= Quacker =

Quacker or Quackers may refer to:

- Quacker (Tom and Jerry), a cartoon duck character from Tom and Jerry
- Quacker, a type of unexplained sound detected by Soviet submarine crews during the Cold War, also known as Bio-duck
- Quackers, a brand of duck-shaped cracker manufactured by Nabisco in the 1980s
- Quackers, an alternative title for the 1978 film Loose Shoes
