= Boner (surname) =

Boner is an Irish, English and Swiss German surname. In Ireland, the name is almost exclusive to County Donegal. Irish variants include Bonner and Bonar. Some notable individuals with the surname:

- Alice Boner (1889–1981), Swiss painter and sculptor, art historian
- Bill Boner (born 1945), former mayor of Nashville, Tennessee
- Brian Boner, American politician and a Republican member of the Wyoming State Senate
- Charles Boner (1815–1870), English travel writer, poet and translator
- Christian Boner (1947–2025), French journalist
- David Boner (born 1941), Scottish footballer
- Gary L. Boner (1940–2005), American football player and coach
- Hylck Boner, wife of 17th century Dutch magistrate Johannes Saeckma
- Jan Boner (before 1463–1523), also known as Hans Boner, German-born Polish merchant and banker
- John Henry Boner (1845–1903), North Carolina poet
- Seraina Boner (born 1982), Swiss cross-country skier
- Ulrich Boner (fl. early 14th century), German-speaking Swiss writer of fable
- William H. Boner (1863–1925), Washington state businessman and politician
