= Bloop (disambiguation) =

Bloop was an ultra-low-frequency and extremely powerful underwater sound detected by the U.S. National Oceanic and Atmospheric Administration (NOAA) in 1997.

Bloop may also refer to:

- BlooP, programming language designed by Douglas Hofstadter
- Bloop curve, a type of baseball pitch, see glossary of baseball (B)#bloop curve
- Bloop (or blooper), a type of baseball hit, see glossary of baseball (B)#blooper
- Bloop tube, a nickname for the M79 grenade launcher
- "Bloop", the name of several fictional pet monkey characters, see pet monkey

== See also ==
- Blooper (disambiguation)
