= Bone (surname) =

Bone is a traditionally Hungarian and modernist English surname. Notable people with the surname Bone include:

== Arts and entertainment ==
- Alexander Bone (born 1996), British saxophonist, record producer, and composer
- Drummond Bone, British academic, expert on Byron
- Gertrude Helena Bone (1876–1962), Scottish writer
- Henry Pierce Bone (1779–1855), English enamel painter
- Houston Bone (born 1993), Canadian filmmaker and writer
- Ian Bone (author) (born 1956), Australian writer, author and novelist
- John T. Bone (1947–2019), British-born actor
- Muirhead Bone (1876–1953), Scottish artist
- Philip J. Bone (1873–1964), English mandolinist and guitarist
- Phyllis Bone (1894–1972), Scottish sculptor
- Ponty Bone, American accordionist
- Robert Trewick Bone (1790–1840), English painter of sacred, classical and genre scenes
- Stephen Bone (1904–1958), English artist and writer

== Politics ==
- Homer Bone (1883–1970), United States federal judge and Senator from Washington
- Ian Bone (born 1947), English anarchist
- Peter Bone (born 1952), British politician
- Scott Cordelle Bone (1860–1936), American politician, founded Iditarod Trail Sled Dog Race, Governor of Alaska

== Religion ==
- Eleanor Bone (1911–2001), English Wiccan
- Gavin Bone (born 1964), English author and lecturer in the fields of magic and witchcraft
- Heinrich Bone (1813–1893), German educator and hymnwriter
- John Bone (bishop) (1930–2014), British religious leader

== Science and engineering ==
- Guillermina Uribe Bone (1920–2018), civil engineer, first woman to earn a degree in civil engineering from the National University of Colombia in Bogotá
- Rebeca Uribe Bone (1917–2017), chemical engineer, first woman to graduate in engineering in Colombia

== Sport ==
- Adrián Bone (born 1988), Ecuadorian footballer
- Alex Bone (born 1971), Scottish footballer
- Edwina Bone (born 1988), Australian field hockey player
- Jimmy Bone (1949–2025), Scottish footballer and manager
- John Gavin Bone (1914–1983), Scottish Olympic cyclist
- Jordan Bone (born 1997), American basketball player
- Kelsey Bone (born 1991), American basketball player
- Ken Bone (born 1958), American basketball coach
- Mick Bone (born 1942), Australian rules footballer
- Oliver Bone (born 1981), Canadian sailor
- Randall Bone (born 1973), Australian rules footballer
- Tiberiu Bone (1929–1983), Romanian footballer

== Other ==
- Deborah Bone (1963–2014), British mental health nurse
- Edith Bone (1889–1975), Hungarian medical professional, journalist and translator
- James Bone (1872–1962), British journalist and London editor of The Guardian
- Ken Bone (personality) (born 1982), American citizen and Internet meme

== See also ==
- Members of Bone Thugs-n-Harmony, American rap group from Cleveland, Ohio:
  - Krayzie Bone
  - Layzie Bone
  - Wish Bone
  - Bizzy Bone
  - Flesh-n-Bone
- Jay Buhner, baseball player, nicknamed "Bone"
