= Blooper (disambiguation) =

A blooper is a mistake made on television or in film.

Blooper or bloopers may also refer to:

== Arts, entertainment, and media ==
- Blooper (band), an American indie rock band
- Blooper (Mario), an enemy in the Mario franchise
- (Blooper) Bunny, an eight-minute cartoon released in 1991 by Warner Bros.
- Bloopers (TV series), 2012

== Sports ==
- Blooper (mascot), the mascot for the Atlanta Braves
- Blooper, a type of baseball hit, see Glossary of baseball (B)
- Blooper (sail), type of headsail which, according to competitive sailing rules, counts as a jib and not a spinnaker

== Other uses ==
- Blooper is the nickname of the M79 Grenade launcher, a weapon used extensively by American infantry forces during the Vietnam War

== See also ==
- Bloop (disambiguation)
  - Bloop, ultra-low frequency and extremely powerful underwater sound
- The Phantom Blooper: A Novel of Vietnam, a novel by Gustav Hasford
