= List of unexplained sounds =

List of unidentified or formerly unidentified sounds

The following is a list of sounds which are currently, or were previously, unidentified. All of the NOAA sound files in this article have been sped up by at least a factor of 16 to increase intelligibility by condensing them and raising the frequency from infrasound to a more audible and reproducible range.

== Currently unidentified sounds ==
=== The Hum ===
The Hum is a persistent and invasive low-frequency humming, rumbling, or droning noise audible to many but not all people. Different causes have been attributed, including local mechanical sources, often from industrial plants, as well as manifestations of tinnitus or other biological auditory effects.

=== Longfellow Boom ===
The Longfellow Boom is a loud and unexplained phenomenon reported in the Longfellow community of Minneapolis, Minnesota, United States. The booms reportedly generally take place on summer nights, and have been described by residents as "house-shakingly loud" and at lower tone, distinct from a car crash or gunshot.

=== Skyquakes ===
Skyquakes or mistpouffers are a sound phenomenon generally occurring near large bodies of water, described as comparable to distant cannon fire or thunder. The sound has been reported around the world, with several cases documented in the 19th century.

=== The Ping ===
The Ping is a "hum" or "beep" detected by shipboard sonars in the Fury and Hecla Strait of northern Canada during the summer of 2016. It was investigated by Canadian military authorities, who did not detect any anomalies on the seabed, where the sound originated. Possible causes include local sonar surveys or the acoustics of Arctic ice.

== Formerly unidentified sounds ==
=== NOAA ===
The following previously unidentified sounds have been detected by the U.S. National Oceanic and Atmospheric Administration (NOAA) using its Equatorial Pacific Ocean autonomous hydrophone array. Researchers have since posited volcanic and glacial origins for the sounds.

==== Upsweep ====
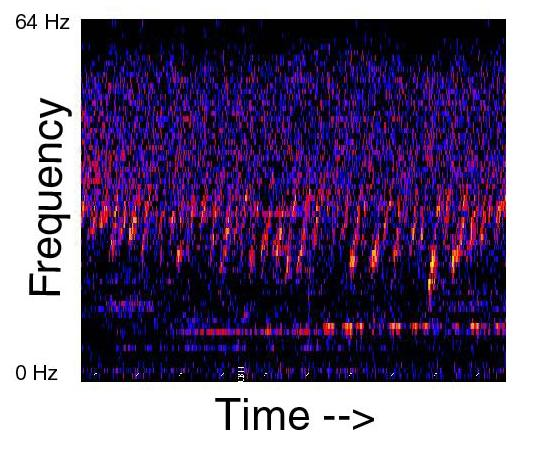
Spectrogram of the Upsweep sound

Upsweep
Upsweep, from the NOAA website at 20× the original speed.

The Upsweep is a sound detected on the American NOAA's equatorial autonomous hydrophone arrays. This sound was present when the Pacific Marine Environmental Laboratory began recording its sound surveillance system, SOSUS, in August 1991. It consists of a long train of narrow-band upsweeping sounds of several seconds in duration each. The source level is high enough to be recorded throughout the Pacific.

The sound appears to be seasonal, generally reaching peaks in spring and autumn, but it is unclear whether this is due to changes in the source or seasonal changes in the propagation environment. The source can be roughly located at 54°S 140°W, between New Zealand and South America. Scientists/researchers of NOAA speculate the sound to be underwater volcanic activity. The Upsweep's level of sound (volume) has been declining since 1991, but it can still be detected on NOAA's equatorial autonomous hydrophone arrays.

==== Whistle ====
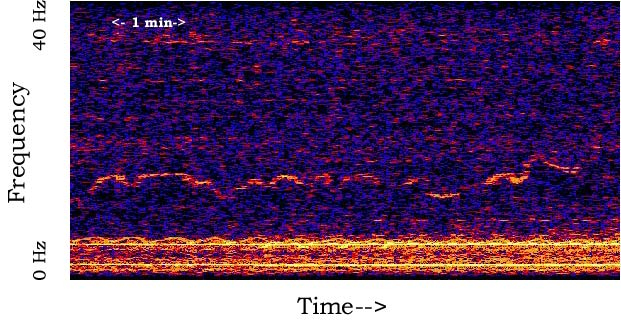
Spectrogram of the Whistle sound

Whistle
The Whistle, from the NOAA website at 16× the original speed.

This sound, dubbed the Whistle, was recorded by the eastern Pacific autonomous hydrophone deployed at 08°N 110°W on July 7, 1997 at 07:30GMT. According to NOAA, the Whistle is similar to volcanogenic sounds previously recorded in the Mariana volcanic arc of the Pacific Ocean. NOAA also stated that locating the source of an event requires at least three recording instruments, and since the Whistle was only recorded on the NW hydrophone, the sound could have traveled a great distance from its source volcano before detection.

==== Bloop ====
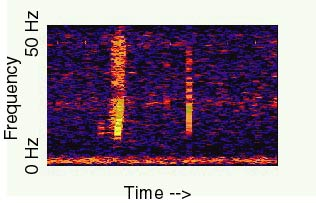
A spectrogram of Bloop

The Bloop is an ultra-low-frequency and extremely powerful underwater sound detected by the U.S. National Oceanic and Atmospheric Administration (NOAA) in 1997. The sound is consistent with the noises generated by icequakes in large icebergs, or large icebergs scraping the ocean floor.

The sound's source was roughly triangulated to a remote point in the south Pacific Ocean west of the southern tip of South America, and the sound was detected several times by the Equatorial Pacific Ocean autonomous hydrophone array.

Bloop
Bloop at 16× the original speed, from the NOAA website.

According to the NOAA description, it "rises rapidly in frequency over about one minute and was of sufficient amplitude to be heard on multiple sensors, at a range of over 5,000 km (3,100 mi)." NOAA's Christopher Fox did not believe its origin was man-made, such as a submarine or bomb. While the audio profile of Bloop does resemble that of a living creature, the source was a mystery both because it was different from known sounds and because it was several times louder than the loudest recorded animal, the blue whale.

The NOAA Vents Program has attributed Bloop to a large icequake. Numerous icequakes share similar spectrograms with Bloop, as well as the amplitude necessary to spot them despite ranges exceeding 5,000 km (3,100 mi). This was found during the tracking of iceberg A53a as it disintegrated near South Georgia Island in early 2008, suggesting that the iceberg(s) involved in generating the sound were most likely between Bransfield Straits and the Ross Sea, or possibly at Cape Adare in Antarctica, a well-known source of cryogenic signals.

==== Julia ====
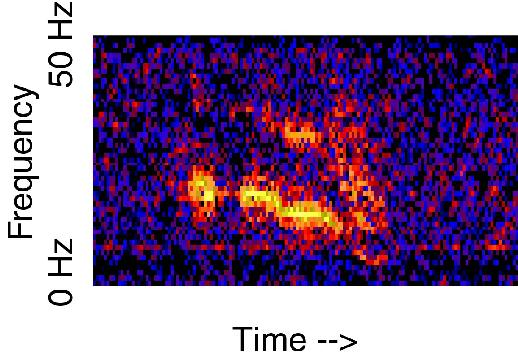
A spectrogram of "Julia"

Julia
Julia sound, from the NOAA website at 16× the original speed.

Julia is a sound recorded on March 1, 1999, by the U.S. National Oceanic and Atmospheric Administration (NOAA). NOAA said the source of the sound was most likely a large iceberg that had run aground off Antarctica. It was loud enough to be heard over the entire Equatorial Pacific Ocean autonomous hydrophone array, with a duration of about 2 minutes and 43 seconds. Due to the uncertainty of the arrival azimuth, the point of origin could only be narrowed to between Bransfield Straits and Cape Adare.

==== Slow Down ====
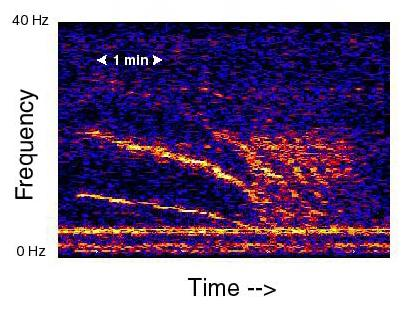
The spectrogram of Slow Down

Slow Down
Slow Down, from the NOAA website at 16× the original speed.

Slow Down is a sound recorded on May 19, 1997, in the Equatorial Pacific Ocean by the U.S. National Oceanic and Atmospheric Administration. The source of the sound was most likely a large iceberg as it became grounded.

The name was given because the sound slowly decreases in frequency over about seven minutes. It was recorded using an autonomous hydrophone array. The sound has been picked up several times each year since 1997. One of the hypotheses on the origin of the sound is moving ice in Antarctica. Sound spectrograms of vibrations caused by friction closely resemble the spectrogram of the Slow Down. This suggests the source of the sound could have been caused by the friction of a large ice sheet moving over land.

==== Sea Train ====
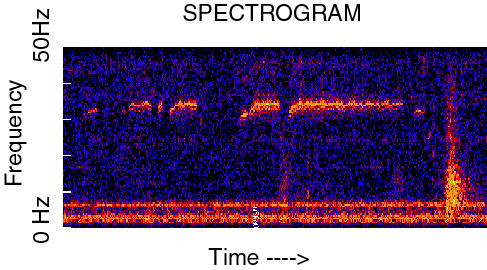
Spectrogram of the train sound

The Sea Train is the name given to a sound recorded on March 5, 1997, on the Equatorial Pacific Ocean autonomous hydrophone array. The sound rises to a quasi-steady frequency. According to the NOAA, the origin of the sound is most likely generated by a very large iceberg grounded in the Ross Sea, near Cape Adare.

Train
The Train, from the NOAA website at 16× the original speed.

=== Other identified sounds ===
- Bio-duck, a quacking-like sound produced by the Antarctic minke whale.
- Moodus noises, strange sounds heard in Moodus, Connecticut, later attributed to microquakes.
- Western Pacific Biotwang - Vocalization produced by Bryde's whales.

== See also ==
- 52-hertz whale
- Lists of unsolved problems
- Numbers station
- Pareidolia
- Signal-to-noise ratio
- Tinnitus
- UVB-76
