= Bone (disambiguation) =

A bone is a rigid connective organ that makes up the skeleton of vertebrates.

Bone may also refer to:

== Places ==
- Bône (département), a short-lived French department in Algeria
- Bone, Idaho, unincorporated community
- Annaba, a city in Algeria, formerly known as Bône
- Bone Regency, a regency of Indonesia
- Bone state, an Indonesian state existing between 1350 and 1960

== People ==
- Bone (surname)
- "Bone," nickname of Major League Baseball player Jay Buhner
- Boné Uaferro (born 1992), Mozambican football defender

== Arts, entertainment, and media ==
=== Fictional characters ===
- Bone, a cat from the Warriors novel series
- Mr. Bone, pseudonym of Dr. David Huxley in Bringing Up Baby (1938)

=== Games ===
- Bone: Out from Boneville, a computer game based on the Bone comic book series
  - Bone: The Great Cow Race, the sequel to Bone: Out from Boneville
- Bone, a slang term for objects used in gaming:
  - Dice
  - Bone (dominoes), in dominoes

=== Literature ===
- Bone, a novel by Fae Myenne Ng
- Bone (comics), a comic book series by Jeff Smith

=== Music ===
- Bone (recording), Soviet-era bootleg records, scratched into scavenged sheets of plastic
- Bone, a band composed of Hugh Hopper, Nick Didkovsky and John Roulat
- Bone Thugs-n-Harmony, an American rap group from Cleveland, Ohio or the members of the group
- Trombone, musical instrument, casually referred to as "bone" in slang
- Bone, a 2004 album by Tim Booth

=== Radio ===
- KSAN (FM), a radio station licensed to San Mateo, California, and serving the San Francisco Bay Area known as 107.7 the Bone
- WHPT, a radio station licensed to Sarasota, Florida, and serving the Tampa Bay area, known as 102.5 the Bone
- WILT (FM), a radio station licensed to Wrightsville Beach, North Carolina, United States, once known as 103.7 the Bone
- WNTB, a radio station licensed to Topsail Beach, North Carolina, United States, once known as 93.7 the Bone
- WBAP-FM, a radio station licensed to Haltom City, Texas, United States, once known as 93.3 The Bone
- WHXR, a radio station licensed to Scarborough, Maine, United States, known as 106.3 The Bone
- KLNC, a radio station licensed to Lincoln, Nebraska, United States, known as 105.3 The Bone
- WYAI, a radio station licensed to Scotia, New York, United States, once known as The Bone
- WNNH, a radio station licensed to Henniker, New Hampshire, United States, known as 99.1 The Bone
- WYKV, a radio station licensed to Ravena, New York, United States, once known as The Bone
- WGPR-HD3, The Bone, a radio station stream

=== Other uses in arts, entertainment, and media ===
- Bone (film), a 1972 film directed by Larry Cohen
- BONE, a journal published by the International Bone and Mineral Society

== Other uses ==
- Bone (corsetry), a rigid vertical rib that gives a corset its shape and rigidity
- The Bone, a feature of Maolán Buí, Ireland
- Bone, a type of dog toy, some of which are artificial
- Bone, an element used in skeletal animation
- Bone, a slang term for the United States dollar
- B-1 Lancer bomber, known as bone (from "B-one")
- Bone china, a type of porcelain

== See also ==
- Boner (disambiguation)
- Bones (disambiguation)
- Boning (disambiguation)
