= Blunder =

A blunder refers to a "stupid, careless mistake". Specific instances include:

- Blunder (chess), a very poor move in chess
- Hopetoun Blunder, an event in Australian history
- Brand blunder, in marketing
- Himalayan Blunder, in Indian history

== Television ==
- Blunder (TV series), a British comedy programme first shown on E4 in 2006

== See also ==
There are various colloquial terms, as a rule with slightly different connotations, for various forms and contexts of blunder. For example:

- Boner, which has been used both as a synonym for "howler" and for more material blunders
