= Bio-duck =

Formerly unidentified sound now known to be vocalizations of the Antarctic minke whale

Bio-duck sound

Bio-duck is the name given to a previously unidentified sound recorded in the Southern Ocean, specifically in Antarctic waters and off the west coast of Australia. It was first reported in 1960 by submarine personnel, who gave the sound its name, associating it with that of a duck. Once dubbed "one of the largest still unresolved mysteries of the Southern Ocean", the origin of the sound remained a mystery for decades until 2014, when it was concluded that the sound originated from Antarctic minke whales (Balaenoptera bonaerensis).

The recorded sound has a frequency range between 60 and 100 Hz, harmonics up to 1 khz, and an interval of 1.6 to 3.1 seconds between each sound. The sound is mainly present during the austral winter in the Southern Ocean, and is made near the surface, predominantly before feeding dives. Although the role of the sound remains a mystery, it is suggested that it could play a role in mating.

Researchers say that this discovery is significant in estimating seasonal occurrence, migration patterns and abundance of the Antarctic minke whales as acoustic research is more cost-effective than visual sightings and can be carried out regardless of weather and daylight conditions. Moreover, acoustic research is invaluable since Antarctic minke whales inhabit areas of high sea ice, making conventional ship-based research challenging.

== Method of discovery ==
During the austral summer of 2013, a research team led by Denise Risch attached suction-cupped recording devices to two Antarctic minke whales. The devices were attached directly from a boat using a pole and it collected sound, temperature, pressure, acceleration and magnetic fields. Both tagged Antarctic minke whales travelled in a group with the same species, ranging from 5 to 40 whales per group. Each tag recorded for 18 hours and 8 hours, respectively, and during that time both whales fed continuously. 32 calls were made during this time, of which 6 had similar properties to pre-existing recordings of a bio-duck sound. Additionally, low frequency down sweeps, a sound previously associated with the Antarctic minke whales, were also sampled from the tags. Since no other marine mammal species were observed within 1 km of the tagged whales and given that the whales travelled in single-species groups, Risch's research team concluded that the source of the sound was either the tagged whale itself, or other Antarctic minke whales travelling in the same group.

== Factors that affect occurrence ==
To investigate in what context bio-duck sounds occur, research was conducted off the west coast of South Africa to see if there is any connection between frequency of bio-duck sounds and three variables. The variables were "distance of sea ice edge" (from recording position), "month of the year" and "time of the day". The researchers concluded that month of the year was the most prominent variable, followed by distance from sea ice and lastly, time of the day. Another study came to a similar conclusion, determining that there is positive correlation between Antarctic minke whales time spent calling and sea ice presence. Furthermore, since there was a relative increase in calling behavior once sea ice coverage reached 50%, researchers suggest that perhaps a certain threshold must be met in order to significantly affect calling behavior.

== Purpose of sound ==
The function of the calling behavior of the Antarctic minke whale is still unknown. It was previously hypothesized that the function of the calls was for navigating areas with dense sea-ice coverage, but multiple acoustic research sources deny this, as bio-duck sounds were also detected at lower latitude areas with no sea ice, such as the coast off Namibia and the Perth Canyon.

A paper published in 2017 suggests that calling behavior could be connected to feeding. The study noticed that during April to August, the vocal activity of Antarctic minke whale followed a pattern of high activity at midnight and less at mid-day. However, the period with the highest vocal activity was also detected during times of minimal irradiance, suggesting that the pattern is not caused by the animals reacting to the sun. Instead, the vocal frequency matched the diel vertical migration of krill, a main diet of the Antarctic minke whales. Higher concentrations of krill were detected close to the surface during nighttime, and lower concentrations during the day. This matches the feeding behavior of the Antarctic minke whales, which feed by swimming directly under the sea-ice, sweeping for krill. The research hence suggested that during the months of May and July, calling behavior of Antarctic minke whales could be related to feeding. Additionally, they hypothesized that this may be done in a mating context, to attract potential mates to better feeding grounds, or simply because the whales feeding at deeper sea levels during the day are not capable of calling simultaneously. However, other researchers claim that the frequency of bio-duck calls does not correspond with diel patterns, and any pattern could be site-specific.

Alternatively, other researchers suggest that the bio-duck calls could play a role in mating. This is because the periods with highest acoustic presence of Antarctic minke whales aligned with their breeding season at lower latitudes of the Antarctic Ocean. Additionally, the bio-duck sound shared similar acoustic properties to a "pulse train" which is another call by minke whales believed to serve reproductive functions. A research published in 2020 by Diego discusses this hypothesis. The research analyzed 9 years' worth of acoustic data collected between 2008 and 2016 from 21 locations throughout the Weddell Sea and hypothesized that Antarctic minke whales have breeding grounds both at high latitudes with dense ice cover, as well as lower latitudes. Combining this fact with research from 1995 which noted that breeding grounds of Antarctic minke whales in lower-latitude areas are less concentrated compared to other cetaceans which favor shore waters, Diego hypothesized that the repetitive properties of the bio-duck sound are for attracting mates over longer distances. However, they also state that further research of the context in which the sound is produced is necessary before any conclusions can be made.

== Acoustic properties ==
Characteristics of a typical bio-duck sound lies in its repetitive nature. From acoustic data collected at Perth Canyon between 14 October 2002 to 20 December 2002, Matthews and his research team initially noted three types of bio-duck sounds and classified them into two major types, with one being a variant of another.

The first type, Type 1, had a 1.6-second interval between each pulse, with every pulse containing multiple frequency sweeps. The frequency range of Type 1 was between 50 Hz and 200 Hz. The second signal type, Type 2, had an interval of 3.1 seconds between each pulse, with each pulse also containing multiple frequency sweeps. The frequency range of Type 2 was between 100 Hz and 200 Hz. Type 2 also had a variant, which shared similar properties.

However, later research by marine biologist Talia Dominello recorded different bio-duck calls in the Western Antarctic Peninsula, thereby expanding and reclassifying types of bio-duck sounds. Type A1, the most common call detected by previous research, can be characterized as a series of four pulses with peak frequency between 130 and 150 Hz. Its variant, Type A2, does not necessarily have four pulses and has unpredictable end frequency. Dominello considered these two variants of one another, as they observed an individual whale seemingly using these two types interchangeably. Type B has a wider frequency range and more pulses per series compared to Type A. However, since this type of call is faint or overlapping with A1, further data is required to make conclusive statements on their characteristics. Type C bio-duck sounds have a special characteristic, where the start frequency and peak frequency of every series gradually decrease with each pulse. Bio-duck type C was not frequently encountered in this research. Type D bio-duck sounds shared similar properties to the downsweep sequence, but Dominello classified them as a separate type of bio-duck sound since they observed a repetitive pattern.

A 2020 study conducted off the western coast of South Africa further expanded Dominello's classification of bio-duck sounds, categorizing the Type B bio-duck sound into two further subtypes, B1 and B2. Type B1 corresponds to Dominello's Type B bio-duck sound and features a decreasing peak frequency with every pulse. While in the newly classified B2, the peak frequency increases with every pulse, with harmonics that can go up to 2 kHz.

== See also ==
- List of unexplained sounds
