= Mr Bones (disambiguation) =

Mr Bones is a 2001 South African comedy film.

Mr Bones may also refer to:

- Mr. Bones (video game), 1996

== Characters ==
- Mr Bones (Judge Dredd), a character from the comic strip Judge Dredd
- Mister Bones, a DC Comics character
- Mister Bones (Star Wars), a Star Wars droid character
- Mr Bones, a minstrel show character

== People ==
- Jamie Spaniolo (born 1975), a.k.a. Mr. Bones, American rapper
- Barnum Brown (1873–1963), American paleontologist whose popular nickname was "Mr. Bones"

== See also ==
- Bones (disambiguation)
