= Bonar =

Bonar may refer to:

== People ==
- Bonar (name)

== Places ==
- Bonar-e Ab-e Shirin, a village in Bushehr Province, Iran
- Bonar-e Azadegan, a village in Bushehr Province, Iran
- Bonar-e Soleymani, a village in Bushehr Province, Iran
- Bonar Bridge, a village in Scotland

== Other uses ==
- Bonar Bridge F.C., football club
- Bonar Creek, a former creek in Mimico, Ontario, Canada
- Bonar Creek (Dutch Fork tributary), Pennsylvania, US
- Bonar Hall, historical building
- Bonar Law Memorial High School, Five Rivers, New Brunswick, Canada
- Bonar River, New Zealand

== See also ==
- Boner (disambiguation)
- Boñar
