= Upsweep =

Unexplained underwater sound

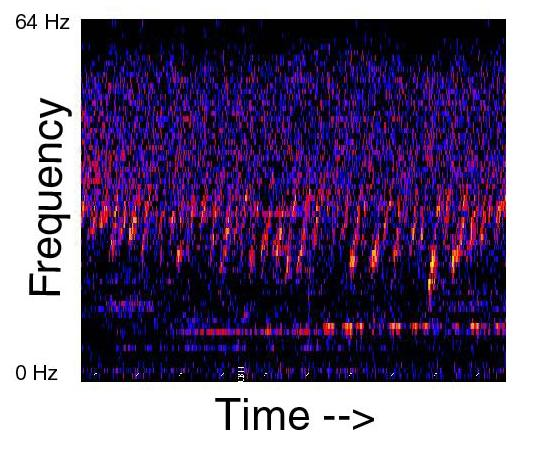
A spectrogram of Upsweep

The Upsweep is a sound detected by the U.S. National Oceanic and Atmospheric Administration's (NOAA) equatorial autonomous hydrophone arrays. The sound was recorded in August 1991, using the Pacific Marine Environmental Laboratory's underwater sound surveillance system, SOSUS, and is loud enough to be detected throughout the entire Pacific Ocean. By 1996, early speculation that the sound originated from a biological source was dismissed. (Note: Hulse notes that the theory that the sound is biological is dismissed in 1996.) The sound consists of a long train of narrow-band upsweeping sounds that occur in intervals of several seconds each. Upsweep occurs and changes seasonally, and is therefore speculated by NOAA scientists to originate from areas of underwater volcanic activity.

== Sound profile ==
The sound's source is roughly located at 54°S 140°W, in a remote region of the Pacific Ocean between New Zealand and approximately 2,500 miles due west of the southern tip of South America. The sound varies seasonally, usually reaching peaks around spring and fall, but it is unclear whether this is due to changes in the source or seasonal propagation changes in the sound's environment. The sound consists of a long sequence of repeating vertical "sweeps" from low to high frequency lasting for roughly three seconds each and is loud enough to be heard by the entire Equatorial Pacific Ocean autonomous hydrophone array system. Upsweep is characterized by its anomalous reverberating tone, such as those from an ambulance or siren.

Upsweep
Upsweep, from the NOAA website at 20x the original speed.

The sound was heard by a system of hydrophones operated by the NOAA's Sound Surveillance System (SOSUS) program for monitoring the northeast Pacific Ocean for low-level seismic activity and detection of volcanic activity along the northeast Pacific spreading centers. Researchers initially attributed the sound to fin whales; however, this theory was dismissed after it was argued there was not enough variation in the tone for the sound to be biological. (Note: The sound's biological origin theory lacks tone variation for such to be true.)

Scientists have traced the source's origins near the location of inferred volcanic seismicity. Since 1991, the Upsweep's level of sound (volume) has been declining, but it can still be detected on NOAA's hydrophone arrays.

== Volcanic origin ==
A leading theory of the origins of Upsweep attributes the sound to underwater volcanic and seismic activity. Submarine volcanic eruptions are characteristic of the formation of rift zones found in all of the Earth's major ocean basins. These are also known as seafloor spreading centers, where the SOSUS program was established by the NOAA to monitor seafloor earthquake and volcanic activity. The Monterey Bay Aquarium Research Institute described the acoustic characteristics of these phenomena as:

Underwater volcanoes make a variety of sounds when they erupt, from short, sharp cracks to booming explosions and low rumbles. Geologists aren't sure exactly what causes all these different sounds.

The source's approximate location has led scientists to infer its source was near an area of underwater volcanic seismicity; however, the sound's exact location is unknown.

== See also ==
- List of unexplained sounds
