= Bones (nickname) =

Bones is a nickname. Notable people with this nickname include:

== People ==
=== Music ===
- Elias Andra (born 1973), American rock drummer
- Bones Hillman (1958–2020), New Zealand musician
- Bones Howe (born 1933), American record producer and engineer
- Tom Malone (musician) (born 1947), American jazz musician, arranger and producer

=== Sports ===
==== Gridiron football ====
- Bobby Bryant (born 1944), American football player who played for the Minnesota Vikings
- Bob "Bones" Hamilton (1912–1996), American college football player (Stanford Indians)
- Bones Weatherly (1928–2004), American football player (Chicago Bears)

==== Ice hockey ====
- Bones Allen (1881–1941), Canadian ice hockey defenseman and lacrosse player
- Gary Bromley (born 1950), Canadian ice hockey goaltender
- Don Raleigh (1926–2012), Canadian ice hockey centre

==== Other sports ====
- Clarence Adams (boxer) (born 1974), American boxer
- Bones Ely (1863–1952), American Major League Baseball player
- Bones Hyland (born 2000), American basketball player
- Bones McKinney (1919–1997), American basketball player and coach
- Sean Ryan (swimmer) (born 1992), American distance swimmer
- Dick Tomanek (1931–2023), American Major League Baseball pitcher
- Jon Jones (born 1987), American mixed martial artist
- Jim "Bones" Mackay (born 1965), caddy for golfer Phil Mickelson

=== Other ===
- Gary Berland (1950–1988), American poker player
- Frank Jenner (1903–1977), English-Australian evangelist

== Fictional characters ==
- Temperance "Bones" Brennan, from the television series Bones
- Leonard McCoy, from the Star Trek franchise

== See also ==
- Chandler Harper (1914-2004), American golfer nicknamed "Old Bones"
- Jay Buhner (born 1964), American former Major League Baseball player nicknamed "Bone"
- Chris McDermott (born 1963), former Australian rules footballer nicknamed "Bone"
- Ivar the Boneless (died 873?), Viking leader
- T-Bone (disambiguation), which includes a list of people with the nickname
