= T-Bone =

T-bone is a steak of beef.

T-Bone may also refer to:

== Music ==
- Trombone (nickname)
  - T-Bone Concerto, a concerto for trombone and wind orchestra by Johan de Meij
- The T-Bones, an American instrumental pop/rock group
- "T-Bone", a song from the album Re·ac·tor by Neil Young and Crazy Horse

== People ==
- T Bone Burnett (born 1948), American musician, songwriter and producer
- T-Bone Slim (1890–1942), pen name for American poet, songwriter and labour activist Matti Valentine Huhta
- T-Bone Walker (1910–1975), American blues guitarist, singer and songwriter
- T-Bone Wilson, Guyanese-British actor, dramatist and poet
- T-Bone (rapper), American Christian rapper
- Tony "T-Bone" Bellamy (1946–2009), lead guitarist, pianist and vocalist for the band Redbone
- Tom "T-Bone" Stankus, American children's musician
- Tom "T-Bone" Wolk (1951–2010), American bassist
- Teebone, British UK garage/drum and bass producer and DJ

== Fictional characters ==
- Captain T-Bone, from the One Piece manga series
- Chance "T-Bone" Furlong, an anthropomorphic feline from the series SWAT Kats: The Radical Squadron
- T-Bone, an arsonist and George Bluth's cell-mate in "Top Banana", a season 1 episode of Arrested Development
- T-Bone, a canine character in the television series Clifford the Big Red Dog
- T-Bone Mendez, in the videogame Grand Theft Auto: San Andreas
- Raymond Kenney, also known as T-Bone from Watch Dogs series
- T-Bone, a skeleton who is a minor character in Skylanders series
- T-Bone, a skeleton who is a villain in the video game Cuphead
- T-Bone, a bull villager from Animal Crossing, a video game series
- T-Bone, a character in the 2017 film Paddington 2
- T Bone, the protagonist of T Bone N Weasel, a 1992 television film directed by Lewis Teague

== Other uses ==
- Kansas City T-Bones, a minor league baseball team
- T-bone accident, where the front or rear of a moving vehicle crashes into the side of another vehicle
- T-Bone, a nickname for the Beechcraft Twin Bonanza, a light twin-engined airplane
