= List of whale vocalizations =

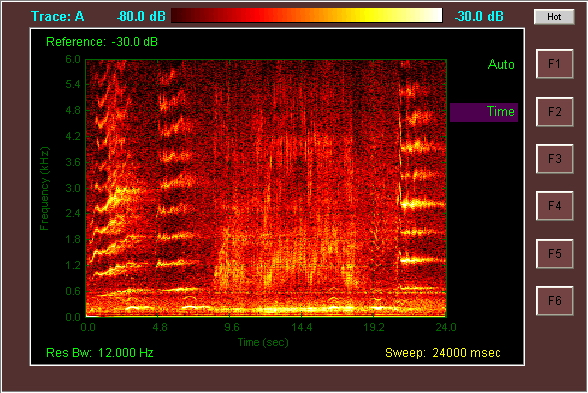
Spectrogram of humpback whale vocalizations. Detail is shown for the first 24 seconds of the 37-second recording of humpback whale song. Spectrogram generated with Fatpigdog's PC based Real Time FFT Spectrum Analyzer.

Whale vocalizations are the sounds made by whales to communicate. The word "song" is used in particular to describe the pattern of regular and predictable sounds made by some species of whales (notably the humpback and bowhead whales) in a way that is reminiscent of human singing.

Humans produce sound by expelling air through the larynx. The vocal cords within the larynx open and close as necessary to separate the stream of air into discrete pockets of air. These pockets are shaped by the throat, tongue, and lips into the desired sound.

Cetacean sound production differs markedly from this mechanism. The precise mechanism differs in the two major suborders of cetaceans: the Odontoceti (toothed whales—including dolphins) and the Mysticeti (baleen whales—including the largest whales, such as the blue whale).

== Blue whale (Balaenoptera musculus) ==
A blue whale song
Recorded in the Atlantic (1)

A blue whale song
Recorded in the Atlantic (2)

A blue whale song
Recorded in North Eastern Pacific

A blue whale song
Recorded in the South Pacific

A blue whale song
Recorded in the West Pacific

Estimates made by Cummings and Thompson (1971) and Richardson et al. (1995) suggest that source level of sounds made by blue whales are between 155 and 188 decibels with reference to one micropascal metre. All blue whale groups make calls at a fundamental frequency of between 10 and 40 Hz, and the lowest frequency sound a human can typically perceive is 20 Hz. Blue whale calls last between ten and thirty seconds. Additionally blue whales off the coast of Sri Lanka have been recorded repeatedly making "songs" of four notes duration lasting about two minutes each, reminiscent of the well-known humpback whale songs.

All of the baleen whale sound files on this page (with the exception of the humpback vocalizations) are reproduced at 10x speed to bring the sound into the human auditory band.

Vocalizations produced by the Eastern North Pacific population have been well studied. This population produces long-duration, low frequency pulses ("A") and tonal calls ("B"), upswept tones that precede type B calls ("C"), moderate-duration downswept tones ("D"), and variable amplitude-modulated and frequency-modulated sounds. A and B calls are often produced in repeated co-occurring sequences as song only by males, suggesting a reproductive function. D calls are produced by both sexes during social interactions while foraging and may considered multi-purpose contact calls. Because the calls have also been recorded from blue whale trios from in a putative reproductive context, it has been recently suggested that this call has different functions. The blue whale call recorded off Sri Lanka is a three‐unit phrase. The first unit is a pulsive call ranging 19.8 to 43.5 Hz, lasting 17.9 ± 5.2 s. The second unit is an FM upsweep 55.9 to 72.4 Hz lasting 13.8 ± 1.1 s. The final unit is a long (28.5 ± 1.6 s) tone that sweeps from 108 to 104.7 Hz. The blue whale call recorded off Madagascar, a two‐unit phrase, starts with 5–7 pulses with a center frequency of 35.1 ± 0.7 Hz and duration of 4.4 ± 0.5 s followed by a 35 ± 0 Hz tone lasting 10.9 ± 1.1 s. In the Southern Ocean, blue whales calls last roughly 18 seconds and consist of a 9-s-long, 27 Hz tone, followed by a 1-s downsweep to 19 Hz, and another downsweep to 18 Hz. They also produce short, 1–4 s duration, frequency-modulated calls ranging in frequency between 80 and 38 Hz.

At least seven blue whale song types have been shifting linearly downward in tonal frequency over time, though at different rates.

The Eastern North Pacific blue whale tonal frequency is 31% lower than it was in the early 1960s. The frequency of pygmy blue whales in the Antarctic has steadily decreased at a rate of a few tenths of hertz per year since 2002. One hypothesis is that as blue whale populations recover from whaling, this is increasing sexual selection pressure (i.e., lower frequency indicates larger body size).

== Fin whale (Balaenoptera physalus) ==
A fin whale song
Recorded in the Atlantic

Like other whales, the male fin whale has been observed to make long, loud, low-frequency sounds. Most sounds are frequency-modulated (FM) down-swept infrasonic pulses from 16 to 40 hertz frequency (the range of sounds that most humans can hear falls between 20 hertz and 20 kilohertz). Each sound lasts between one and two seconds, and various combinations of sounds occur in patterned sequences lasting 7 to 15 minutes each. These sequences are then repeated in bouts lasting up to many days.

== Bowhead whale (Balaena mysticetus) ==
Bowhead whales are highly vocal and use low frequency (<1000 Hz) sounds to communicate while travelling, feeding, and socialising. Intense calls for communication and navigation are produced especially during migration season. During breeding season, bowheads make long, complex, variable songs for mating calls. Many tens of distinct songs are sung by a population in a single season. From 2010 through to 2014, near Greenland, 184 distinct songs were recorded from a population of around 300 animals.

== Humpback whale (Megaptera novaeangliae) ==
Common humpback whale vocalizations (plus windy day noise)
Recorded by the National Park Service, using a hydrophone that is anchored near the mouth of Glacier Bay, Alaska, for the purpose of monitoring ambient noise.

A humpback whale song
Recorded by the National Park Service, using a hydrophone that is anchored near the mouth of Glacier Bay, Alaska, for the purpose of monitoring ambient noise.

Humpback whale song
Made by the National Oceanic and Atmospheric Administration

The humpback whale is well known for its long and complex song. Humpbacks repeat patterns of low notes that vary in amplitude and frequency in consistent patterns over a period of hours or even days. Only male humpbacks sing, so it was at first assumed that the songs were solely for courting. While the primary purpose of whale song may be to attract females, it is almost certain that whale song serves myriad purposes.

== Orca (killer whale) (Orcinus orca) ==
Orca echolocation

Call of an orca

Orca calls and echolocation

Like other delphinids, orcas are very vocal animals. They produce a variety of clicks and pulsed calls that are used for echolocation and communication.

Much of the time, resident orcas in the northeast Pacific are more vocal than Bigg's (transient) orcas living in the same waters. Scientists believe that the main reason for this lies in the different hearing abilities of their prey. Resident orcas feed on fish, mostly Pacific salmon, a prey with poor underwater hearing that cannot detect orca sounds at any great distance. Transient orcas on the other hand feed mainly on marine mammals, primarily seals, sea lions, and porpoises. Because all marine mammals have excellent underwater hearing, transients probably remain silent until they have caught their prey to avoid detection by acoustically sensitive animals. For the same reason, the mammal-eating orcas tend to restrict their echolocation, occasionally using just a single click (called a cryptic click) rather than the long train of clicks heard in the fish–eating ecotype.

== Minke whale (Balaenoptera spp.) ==
An Atlantic minke whale

== See also ==
- 52-hertz whale
