= Troncoso =

Troncoso may refer to:

- Carlos Morales Troncoso (1940–2014), vice president of the Dominican Republic 1986–1994
- Carmela Troncoso (born 1982), Spanish telecommunication engineer, researcher and LGBT+ activist
- César Troncoso (born 1963), Uruguayan actor
- Enrique Troncoso Troncoso (1937–2018), Chilean Roman Catholic bishop
- Jorge Troncoso (born 1993), Chilean footballer
- Manuel de Jesús Troncoso de la Concha (1878–1955), intellectual and president of the Dominican Republic 1940–1942
- Martín Troncoso (born 1986), Argentine footballer
- Maruja Troncoso Ortega (born 1937), Spanish soprano and professor
- Patricio Troncoso (born 1993), Chilean footballer
- Ramón Troncoso (born 1983), Dominican baseball player
- Raúl Troncoso (born 1935), Chilean politician
- Sergio Troncoso (born 1961), American author of short stories and novels
