= John Henry Boner =

American editor and poet (1845–1903)

- Born: January 31, 1845; Salem, North Carolina, U.S.
- Died: March 6, 1903 (aged 58); Washington, D.C., U.S.
- Occupations: Editor; poet

John Henry Boner (January 31, 1845 – March 6, 1903) was an American editor and poet from Salem, North Carolina.

Boner was born in Salem's Moravian community. He was educated locally, and at the age of thirteen, he was apprenticed to a newspaper office. In 1865, he started his own Salem newspaper, but by then Boner had become affiliated with the Republican Party, and this bias caused the failure of the paper. Through his political connections, Boner was able to find employment as reading clerk of the North Carolina constitutional convention of 1868 and was chief clerk of the North Carolina House of Representatives from 1869 to 1870. He left North Carolina and entered the civil service in the United States Government Printing Office in Washington, D.C., where he worked until 1886, as a compositor and then as a proofreader. That he was appreciated by his associates is shown by the fact that in 1878 he was president of Columbia Union, No. 101, in which office "he showed executive ability and a thorough knowledge of parliamentary practice, and he gave the union a conservative and safe administration". In 1883 his first book of poems entitled "Whispering Pines" was published.

Soon after the return of the Democratic Party to power in 1885, Boner was discharged from the government service on the ground of offensive partisanship. This was prior to the enactment of non-partisan protections for civil service employees. But by then Boner's poems had brought him fame. Edmund Clarence Stedman, of New York, one of the foremost literary critics of the times, was delighted with Boner's work. In his Poets of America, published in 1885, Stedman specially mentions Boner in writing of Southern poets, and in describing their work he says, "that they open vistas of the life and spirit of the region."

Learning of Boner's removal from office, Stedman invited Boner to New York City, and soon secured congenial employment for Boner on the staff on the Century Dictionary, then in course of preparation. Boner also aided Stedman with the latter's Library of American Literature, and of that service it is recorded "for the accuracy of the text we are greatly indebted to the friendship and professional skill of John H. Boner, of the Century Dictionary staff, who has given much of his spare time to the correcting of our page-proofs, and in other ways has been of service to the work". Boner continued to write poetry, and became recognized as a literary man of much force. His standing as a man of letters received further recognition by his election in 1888 to membership in the Authors Club in New York. His best known poem, "Poe's Cottage at Fordham", appeared in the Century Magazine in November, 1889. Boner continued work on the Century Dictionary, and from 1892-1894 worked on The Standard Dictionary. He then became editor of one of the leading magazines in the United States — The Literary Digest.

Boner resigned from The Literary Digest in 1897 over an editorial dispute. In 1900 he was able, with assistance from his literary acquaintances and New York Senator Chauncey Depew, to overturn the earlier "partisanship" finding and return to the United States Government Printing Office. But in the early 1900s his health began to fail, and finally broke completely. He was still poor, and in order to get money for a trip back home he published another book of poems called "Some New Poems." He suffered greatly from pain and poverty. He died of tuberculosis in Washington, D.C.:

His burial in an unmarked grave in Washington, DC, was a matter of concern to his friends and admirers, who formed the Boner Memorial Association to raise funds to return the poet's body to North Carolina. In December, 1904, Boner was reinterred in the Moravian Cemetery in Salem.

Boner's reputation continued to develop after his death, and he became known as "North Carolina's First Man of Letters".
