= Blooper (band) =

- Origin: Seattle, Washington
- Genres: Indie rock, indie pop, garage rock, surf rock
- Years active: 2011–present
- Labels: Jigsaw Records, Manic Pop!
- Members: Adriano Santi, Chris Mac, Chris Quirk
- Past members: Darrin Ruder
- Website: facebook.com/bloopermusic

Blooper is an American indie and garage rock band from Seattle, consisting of Adriano Santi, Chris Mac and Chris Quirk. The band plays a style of garage rock with strong surf music and powerpop influences. Blooper was formed in 2011 and have released four EPs.

== Background ==
The band started in 2011 as a solo project by Santi, who was soon joined by Quirk and original bassist Darrin Ruder. This formation released the EPs Go Away, Long Distance, and So Very Small, which garnered them attention in the local press and radio stations. Ruder left the band for personal reasons at the end of 2014, being replaced by Chris Mac, formerly of Math and Physics Club.

== Members ==
Current members

- Adriano Santi – guitar and vocals
- Chris Mac – bass guitar and vocals
- Chris Quirk – drums

== Discography ==
EPs

- Ballard Ave. EP (July 2011, independent)
- Go Away (May 2012, independent)
- Long Distance (January 2013, Manic Pop! Records)
- So Very Small (July 2014, Jigsaw Records)
