= Christian Boner =

French journalist (1947–2025)

- Born: 8 December 1947; Poitiers, France
- Died: 10 September 2025 (aged 77)
- Occupation: Journalist

Christian Boner (French: [kʁistjɑ̃ bɔnɛʁ]; 8 December 1947 – 10 September 2025) was a French journalist.

Boner was a longtime telejournalist for Europe 1, as well as TF1, La Chaîne Info, and Radio France Internationale. In 2008, he became an administrator for the Festival mondial du cirque de Demain.

Boner died on 10 September 2025, at the age of 77.

== Publications ==
- L'homme qui a sauvé le cirque Pinder (2005)
- Radio Télé Circus (2009)
- Sur la route des banquistes (2018)
