= Bones (surname) =

Bones is a surname. Notable people with the surname include:

- Bobby Bones (musician), American musician and actor
- Bobby Bones or Bobby Estell (born 1980), host of the Bobby Bones Show
- Brother Bones (1902–1974), American whistling and bone-playing recording artist
- Ebony Bones (born 1982), British singer-songwriter, record producer and actress
- Frankie Bones (born 1966), American techno and house music disc jockey
- Helen Woodrow Bones (1874–1951), American secretary and book editor
- Ken Bones (born 1947), British actor
- Marietta Bones (1842–1901), American suffragist, social reformer, philanthropist
- Mickey Bones, American drummer and singer-songwriter
- Ricky Bones (born 1969), former Major League Baseball pitcher

Fictional Characters with the surname include:

- Billy Bones, a fictional pirate from Robert Louis Stevenson's Treasure Island.
- Mr. Bones, a character from the South-African comedy film with the same name.
