= Guillermina Uribe Bone =

Colombian civil engineer (1920–2018)

- Born: 1920; Guatemala City, Guatemala
- Died: 11 October 2018 (aged 97–98); Bogotá, Colombia
- Education: National University of Colombia
- Occupations: Engineer, civil engineer

Guillermina Uribe Bone (1920 – 11 October 2018) was a Colombian civil engineer. She was the first woman to receive a degree in civil engineering from the Faculty of Mathematics and Engineering of the National University of Colombia in Bogotá, graduating on 18 December 1948.

== Early life ==
Guillermina Uribe Bone was born in Guatemala City in 1920. She was the daughter of Guillermo Uribe Echevarría, a Basque accountant and Maria Teresa Bone Romero, a Guatemalan of English descent. She had seven siblings. Her older siblings were Antonio who became an aviator, Rebeca, the first woman to earn an engineering degree in Colombia, and Helena who became a doctor. Her younger siblings were Carmen, María Teresa, Roberto and Jorge.

In 1928, she moved with her family to Argentina, where her father planned to take up work, and they made a stopover in Medellín. In the end, the family settled there instead.

== Education ==
Uribe Bone graduated from high school in 1941 at the Emakumeen Institutu Zentralean (Central Women's Institute), and the family moved to Bogotá. Her parents were supportive of all their daughters' education and encouraged Guillermina in studying civil engineering, beginning in 1943, at the Faculty of Mathematics and Engineering of the National University of Colombia in Bogotá. She later said in 2004, “Mi papá estaba adelantado para la época, por eso nos estimuló muchísimo. Él tenía un pensamiento sobre la mujer más amplio”. "My father was ahead of his time, which is why he encouraged us so much. He had wider expectations about women."

There were 40 students on the course, and the first year she studied at the facilities of the Central Technical Institute, then went to the University City Campus. There was one other woman studying civil engineering, Rosalba Pachón Gómez, who completed some courses in 1944 but graduated in 1948, after Uribe Bone. She found most of her teachers socially distant, if mostly kind, but that they considered engineering was not for women. It took until the 1980s for the school of engineering to provide women's toilets, which only happened after a group of women students banded together and took one of the men's toilets over, painting the door pink to make their point.

== Career ==
In 1949, she joined the Ministry of Works, in the National Buildings section, and working on projects with three other engineers. Her first job was for the Cali Post Office building; then she was responsible for checking the design of the Olympic Stadium in Santa Marta, a project led by a German engineer. She spent two years in the ministry, the first before graduating and the second as a fully qualified engineer.

== Personal life ==
She married fellow engineer Francisco Stella Ibáñez during her second year in the role, and they eventually had nine children, seven of whom studied at university. Francisco became an electrical engineer; Nicolas became a physicist; María del Carmen became an architect; Luz María became a teacher; María Teresa an architect; María del Rosario became an Architectural Drawing Technician, and Elena and Guillermo.

== Recognition ==
In 2011, as part of an Exhibition Fair held in celebration of the 150th anniversary of the first engineering faculty in Colombia, a tribute was paid to Uribe Bone. The ceremony was attended by President Juan Manuel Santos and Guillermina Uribe Bone was the guest of honour. This was the first time her role as a ground breaking woman engineer had been publicly acknowledged, at the age of 94.

In 2020, the Teknologiaren historiarako Nazioarteko Batzordeak (Icohtec) (the International Commission for the History of Technology) released an online film, tracing the entry of Colombian women into STEM careers from the nineteenth century onwards. The aim was to identify ground breaking women and showcase them as role models for modern girls and women. Only 32% of engineering students in Colombia are female (as of 2020) and the film was intended to encourage more women to take up the subject.

Guillermina Uribe Bone died in Bogotá at the age of 98.

== Commemoration ==
In 2024, the engineering classrooms, building number 453 at the National University of Colombia was named in honour of Guillermina Uribe Bone.
