= Perth Canyon =

Submarine canyon off the coast of Perth, Western Australia

- Location within Western Australia
- Width: 15 km (9.3 mi)
- Area: 2,900 km^{2} (1,100 mi^{2})
- Depth: 4,000 m (13,000 ft)

Geography
- Country: Australia
- State: Western Australia
- Coordinates: 32.01°S 114.98°E
- Interactive map of Perth Canyon

Perth Canyon is a submarine canyon located on the edge of the continental shelf off the coast of Perth, Western Australia, approximately 22 kilometres (14 mi) west of Rottnest Island. It was carved by the Swan River, likely before the Tertiary, when this part of the continental shelf was above sea level. It is an average of 1.5 kilometres (5,000 ft) deep and 15 kilometres (9.3 mi) across, making it similar in dimension to the Grand Canyon.

It occupies an area of 2,900 square kilometres (1,100 sq mi) and ranges in depth from 700 to 4,000 metres (2,300 to 13,100 ft). Within a few kilometres its depth drops from 200 metres (660 ft) down to 1,000 metres (3,300 ft), and then it continues as a deep gully all the way out to the 4,000-metre (13,000 ft) depth, which is about another 30 kilometres (20 mi) further west. It contains the world's largest plunge pool—a depression in the canyon that is 2 kilometres (1.2 mi) long, 6 kilometres (3.7 mi) across, and 300 metres (980 ft) deep. The canyon is considered "a perfect spot" for deep sea fishing.

The Perth Canyon is a feeding ground for pygmy blue whales, especially at the rims of the abyss. It is also a training ground for the Royal Australian Navy Submarine Service, stationed at a naval base at nearby Garden Island.

In June 2006, the waters around the Perth Canyon were the site of an ocean vortex 200 kilometres (120 mi) in diameter and 1,000 metres (3,300 ft) deep. It was visible from space, and scientists claimed at the time that it had the potential to affect the local climate and the climate further abroad. The vortex was described by scientists as a marine "death trap", as it sucked in fish larvae.

== See also ==
- Indian Ocean Gyre
