= Rebeca Uribe Bone =

Colombian chemical engineer (1917–2017)

- Born: 7 July 1917; Guatemala City, Guatemala
- Died: 8 May 2017 (aged 99); Bilbao, Spain
- Occupation: Chemical engineer

Rebeca Uribe Bone (7 July 1917 – 8 May 2017) was a Colombian chemical engineer. She was the first woman to graduate in engineering in Colombia, when she graduated in Chemical Engineering from the Pontifical-Bolivarian University of Medellín.

== Early life ==
Rebeca Uribe Bone was born in Guatemala City on 7 July 1917, the daughter of Guillermo Uribe Echevarría, a Spanish accounting expert of Basque descent, and María Teresa Bone Romero, a Guatemalan of English descent.

Guillermo Uribe, Rebecca's father, left the Basque Country and moved to Guatemala City, where he met and married Maria Teresa Bone. After having six children, they left Guatemala in 1928 and moved to Colombia, where they settled in Medellin and had two further children. The couple were liberal freethinkers and encouraged their daughters to study and take up professions. Ultimately two daughters became engineers: Rebeca a chemical engineer; Guillermina Uribe Bone, a civil engineer; Helena became a doctor, a fourth sister Maria Teresa began to study architecture before an early marriage. The fifth daughter, Carmen, suffered from meningitis as a child which prevented her from studying for a career, but she finished high school. Their brothers became a pilot, lawyer and an architect.

== Education ==
Rebeca completed high school at the Central Women's Institute in Medellin. At the time, the university was opening its doors to suitably qualified women, and her teachers had been very good mathematicians and chemists. These influenced Rebekah to choose chemical engineering as a university career. Her parents were very receptive to the idea, and encouraged her to go to college, as her brothers did. Her sister Guillermina said in 2004, “Mi papá estaba adelantado para la época, por eso nos estimuló muchísimo. Él tenía un pensamiento sobre la mujer más amplio”. "My father was ahead of his time, which is why he encouraged us so much. He had wider expectations about women."

Rebeca Uribe Bone was taught by Joaquín Vallejo Arbeláez, Colombian civil engineer, businessman and writer who later served as 12th Permanent Representative of Colombia to the United Nations. She took courses in general culture and teacher training. Many of her classmates later took up teaching.

On 19 October 1945, Rebeca Uribe Bone received her degree from the Pontifical Bolivarian University (then the Bolivarian Catholic University), and qualified as an industrial chemical engineer

As a new graduate, she began working in the Bavaria brewing company's quality department, and before completing her first year as a chemical engineer, she met the son of a friend of her father's. He was Basque and was visiting Bogotá for a season.

== Personal life ==
Rebeca married him and they set up home in Cali, set up a factory, and had a son. They moved to Bilbao in Spain in the 1980s.

Rebeca was active into old age and used to walk the streets of the neighborhood every day on her own. She was knocked down in a bicycle accident at the age of 95, and on 8 May 2017, at the age of almost a hundred, she died in Bilbao.

== Legacies ==
Premio Rebeca Uribe Bone, Historial Premio Rebeca Uribe Bone a la Mejor Opción de Grado en Ingeniería Química elaborada por una mujer o grupo de mujeres. Consejo Profesional de Ingeniería Química de Colombia - CPIQ (The Rebeca Uribe Bone Award for the Best Degree Option in Chemical Engineering prepared by a woman or group of women).
