= Bloop =

Underwater sound detected in 1997 from a non-tectonic cryoseism (ice quake)

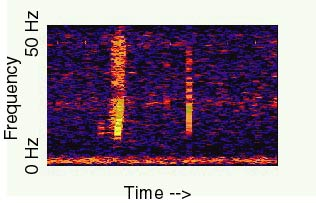
A spectrogram of Bloop

Bloop was an ultra-low-frequency, high-amplitude underwater sound detected by the U.S. National Oceanic and Atmospheric Administration (NOAA) in 1997. By 2012, earlier speculation that the sound originated from a marine animal was replaced by NOAA's description of the sound as being consistent with noises generated via non-tectonic cryoseisms originating from glacial movements such as ice calving, or through seabed gouging by ice.

== Sound profile ==
Bloop
Bloop at 16x the original speed

The sound's source was roughly triangulated to 50°S 100°W, a remote point in the South Pacific Ocean west of the southern tip of South America. The sound was detected by the Equatorial Pacific Ocean autonomous hydrophone array, a system of hydrophones primarily used to monitor undersea seismicity, ice noise, and marine mammal population and migration. This is a stand-alone system designed and built by NOAA's Pacific Marine Environmental Laboratory (PMEL) to augment NOAA's use of the U.S. Navy Sound Surveillance System (SOSUS), which was equipment originally designed to detect Soviet submarines. According to the NOAA description, the sound "rose" in frequency over about one minute and was sufficiently loud to be heard on multiple sensors at a range of over 5,000 km (3,000 miles).

== Ice quake origin ==
The NOAA Vents Program has attributed the sound to that of a large cryoseism (also known as an ice quake). Numerous ice quakes share similar spectrograms with Bloop, as well as the amplitude necessary to detect them despite ranges exceeding 5,000 km (3,000 miles). This was found during the tracking of iceberg A53a as it disintegrated near South Georgia Island in early 2008. The iceberg(s) involved in generating the sound were most likely between Bransfield Strait and the Ross Sea; or possibly at Cape Adare, a well-known source of cryogenic signals. Sounds generated by ice quakes are easily determined through the use of hydrophones since seawater, an excellent sound channel, allows the ambient sounds generated through ice activities to travel great distances.

=== Ice calving ===
In ice calving, variations result from a sound source's motion. Icequakes, caused by the fracturing and movement of large ice masses, can produce powerful low-frequency sounds that propagate over vast distances in water. This mechanism could explain the Bloop's wide detection range and distinct acoustic signature. As oceanographer Yunbo Xie explains, the alteration of waveforms from a detected sound "can also be caused by so-called angular frequency dependent radiation patterns associated with antisymmetric mode motion of the ice cover."

=== Rubbing and ridging events within an ice floe ===
Two processes known as rubbing and ridging are responsible for acoustical emissions similar to those from ice calving. Rubbing involves two or more areas of compacted glacial ice floes which are being forced together, inducing shear deformation at its edges and triggering horizontally-polarized shear waves, i. e. SH waves. Ridging occurs when that ice bends or slides at the ridges. According to Xie, both events will produce sound in the failure sequence (breakup) of an ice floe:

"A wave equation resulting from shear deformation will be defined in an ice floe with the rubbing effect coupled to the floe through its boundary with the adjacent ice," while "ridging deformation(s) revealed by this event indicate that the failure process is associated with a crushing process that seals air or vacuous gaps between ice floes. The acoustical signals emitted by this failure process are similar to those emitted from a collapsing air bubble in a fluid."

== Animal origin ==
NOAA's Christopher Fox, in an interview with CNN in 2001, stated that he believed Bloop to be ice calving in Antarctica. In 2002, Fox was interviewed by David Wolman for an article in New Scientist, where he stated that he did not believe its origin was man-made, such as a submarine or bomb. Fox also stated that, while Bloop's audio profile resembles that of a living creature, the source was a mystery because it would be "far more powerful than the calls made by any animal on Earth." Wolman reported in his article the following:

Fox's hunch is that the sound nicknamed Bloop is the most likely (out of the other recorded unidentified sounds) to come from some sort of animal, because its signature is a rapid variation in frequency similar to that of sounds known to be made by marine beasts. There's one crucial difference, however: in 1997 Bloop was detected by sensors up to 4,800 km (3,000 miles) apart. That means it must be far louder than any whale noise, or any other animal noise for that matter. Is it even remotely possible that some creature bigger than any whale is lurking in the ocean depths? Or, perhaps more likely, something that is much more efficient at making sound?

— David Wolman

According to author Philip Hayward, Wolman's speculations "amplified Fox's 'hunch' and—through the use of the word 'likely'—opened the door for subsequent speculation as to what such an 'efficient' noise-making entity might be. Over the last decade, consensus has supported the argument that the noise is produced by ice fracturing processes."

== See also ==
- List of unexplained sounds
- Wow! signal – 1977 radio signal detected as part of SETI
