= Wildlife of Réunion =

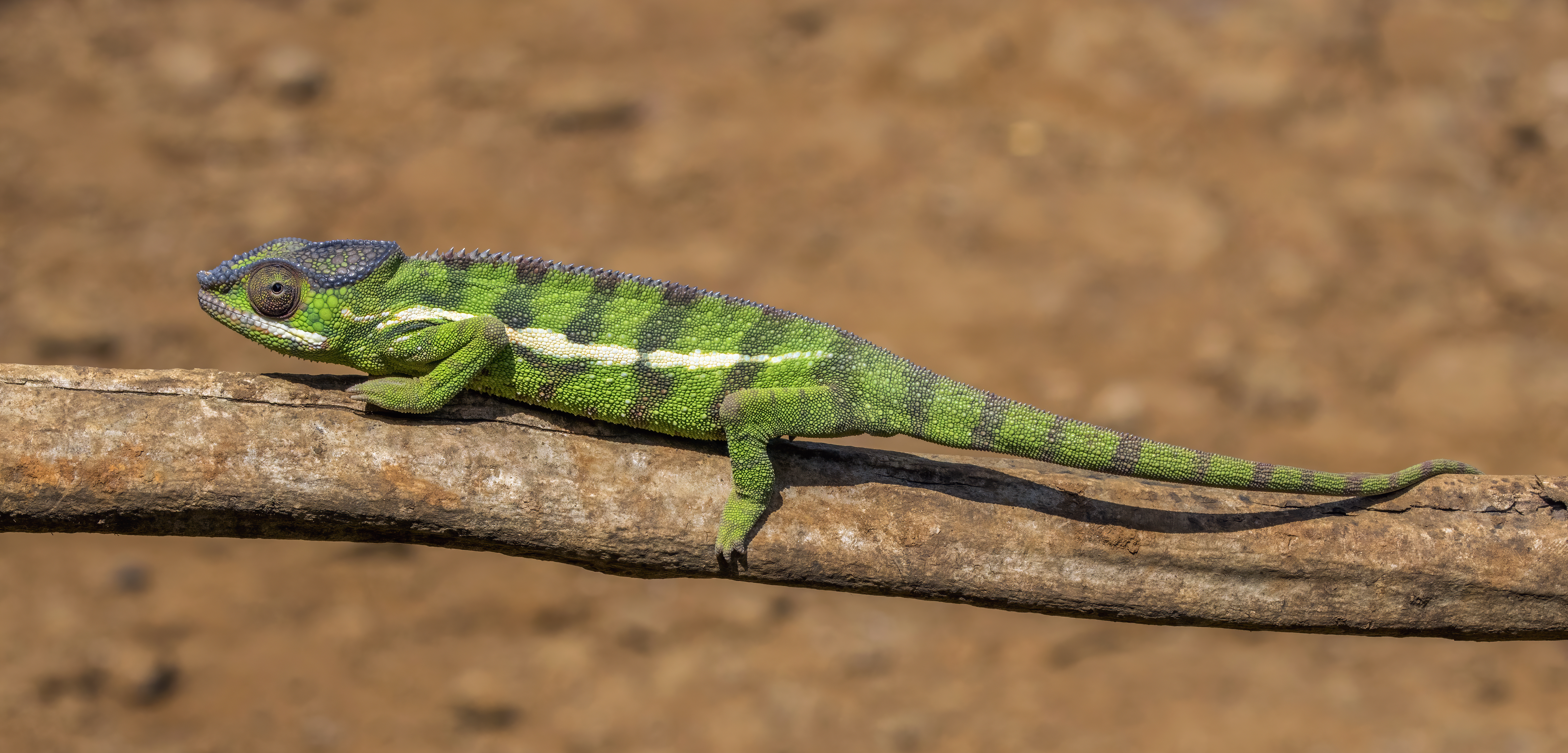
Panther chameleon

The wildlife of Réunion is composed of its flora, fauna and funga. Being a small island, it only has nine native species of mammals, but ninety-one species of birds.

== Fauna ==
=== Mammals ===
- Mauritian flying fox, Pteropus niger VU
- Small Mauritian flying fox, Pteropus subniger EX
- Lesser yellow bat, Scotophilus borbonicus CR
- Natal free-tailed bat, Mormopterus acetabulosus VU
- Mauritian tomb bat, Taphozous mauritianus LC
- Southern right whale, Eubalaena australis LC, rarer in today's Réunion
- Humpback whale, Megaptera novaeangliae LC
- Sei whale, Balaenoptera borealis EN
- Southern fin whale, Balaenoptera physalus quoyi EN
- Sperm whale, Physeter macrocephalus VU
- Dwarf sperm whale, Kogia sima LR/lc
- Blainville's beaked whale, Mesoplodon densirostris DD
- Gray's beaked whale, Mesoplodon grayi DD
- Short-finned pilot whale, Globicephala macrorhynchus DD

Those mammals not native to Réunion include the tailless tenrec, dog, cat, pig, goat, sheep, rat and cattle.

=== Reptiles ===
==== Geckos ====
Seven species of day geckos and four species of night geckos:

- Réunion Island day gecko, Phelsuma borbonica borbonica, endemic
- Réunion Island ornate day gecko, Phelsuma inexpectata, endemic
- Gold dust day gecko, Phelsuma laticauda, introduced from Madagascar
- Lined day gecko, Phelsuma lineata, introduced from Madagascar
- Blue-tailed day gecko, Phelsuma cepediana, introduced from Mauritius around 1960
- Indopacific tree gecko, Hemiphyllodactylus typus, introduced
- Tropical house gecko, Hemidactylus mabouia, introduced
- Common house gecko, Hemidactylus frenatus, introduced
- Phelsuma madagascariensis, introduced from Madagascar in 1970 by a veterinarian
- Pacific gecko, Gehyra mutilata, introduced

==== Agamid lizards ====
- Oriental garden lizard, Calotes versicolor, introduced
- Rainbow agama, Agama agama, introduced around 1999/2000

==== Scincidae ====
- Bojer's skink, Gongylomorphus bojerii, introduced (originally endemic to Mauritius)
- Mauritius skink, Leiolopisma mauritiana, extinct around 1600

==== Chameleons ====
- Panther chameleon, Furcifer pardalis, introduced from Madagascar

==== Snakes ====
Two introduced species;

- Brahminy blind snake, Typhlops braminus
- Indian wolf snake, Lycodon aulicus, introduced from Mauritius around 1850

==== Turtles ====
===== Marine turtles =====
see also:

- Green sea turtle, Chelonia mydas
- Hawksbill sea turtle, Eretmochelys imbricata
- Loggerhead sea turtle, Caretta caretta
- Olive ridley sea turtle, Lepidochelys olivacea
- Leatherback sea turtle, Dermochelys coriacea

===== Land turtles =====
- Réunion giant tortoise, Cylindraspis indica, became extinct 1800
- Radiated tortoise, Astrochelys radiata, introduced from Madagascar

== See also ==
- List of birds of Réunion
- List of mammals of Réunion
- List of extinct animals of Réunion
