= List of mammals of Réunion =

This is a list of the mammal species recorded in Réunion. Of the mammal species in Réunion, one is critically endangered, one is endangered, two are vulnerable, and one is considered to be extinct.

The following tags are used to highlight each species' conservation status as assessed by the International Union for Conservation of Nature:

EX	Extinct	No reasonable doubt that the last individual has died.
EW	Extinct in the wild	Known only to survive in captivity or as a naturalized populations well outside its previous range.
CR	Critically endangered	The species is in imminent risk of extinction in the wild.
EN	Endangered	The species is facing an extremely high risk of extinction in the wild.
VU	Vulnerable	The species is facing a high risk of extinction in the wild.
NT	Near threatened	The species does not meet any of the criteria that would categorise it as risking extinction but it is likely to do so in the future.
LC	Least concern	There are no current identifiable risks to the species.
DD	Data deficient	There is inadequate information to make an assessment of the risks to this species.

== Order: Chiroptera (bats) ==
The bats' most distinguishing feature is that their forelimbs are developed as wings, making them the only mammals capable of flight. Bat species account for about 20% of all mammals.

- Family: Pteropodidae (flying foxes, Old World fruit bats)
  - Subfamily: Pteropodinae
    - Genus: Pteropus
      - Mauritian flying fox, P. niger VU (extirpated)
      - Small Mauritian flying fox, P. subniger EX
- Family: Vespertilionidae
  - Subfamily: Vespertilioninae
    - Genus: Scotophilus
      - Lesser yellow bat, S. borbonicus CR
- Family: Molossidae
  - Genus: Mormopterus
    - Natal free-tailed bat, M. acetabulosus VU
- Family: Emballonuridae
  - Genus: Taphozous
    - Mauritian tomb bat, T. mauritianus LC

== Order: Cetacea (whales) ==
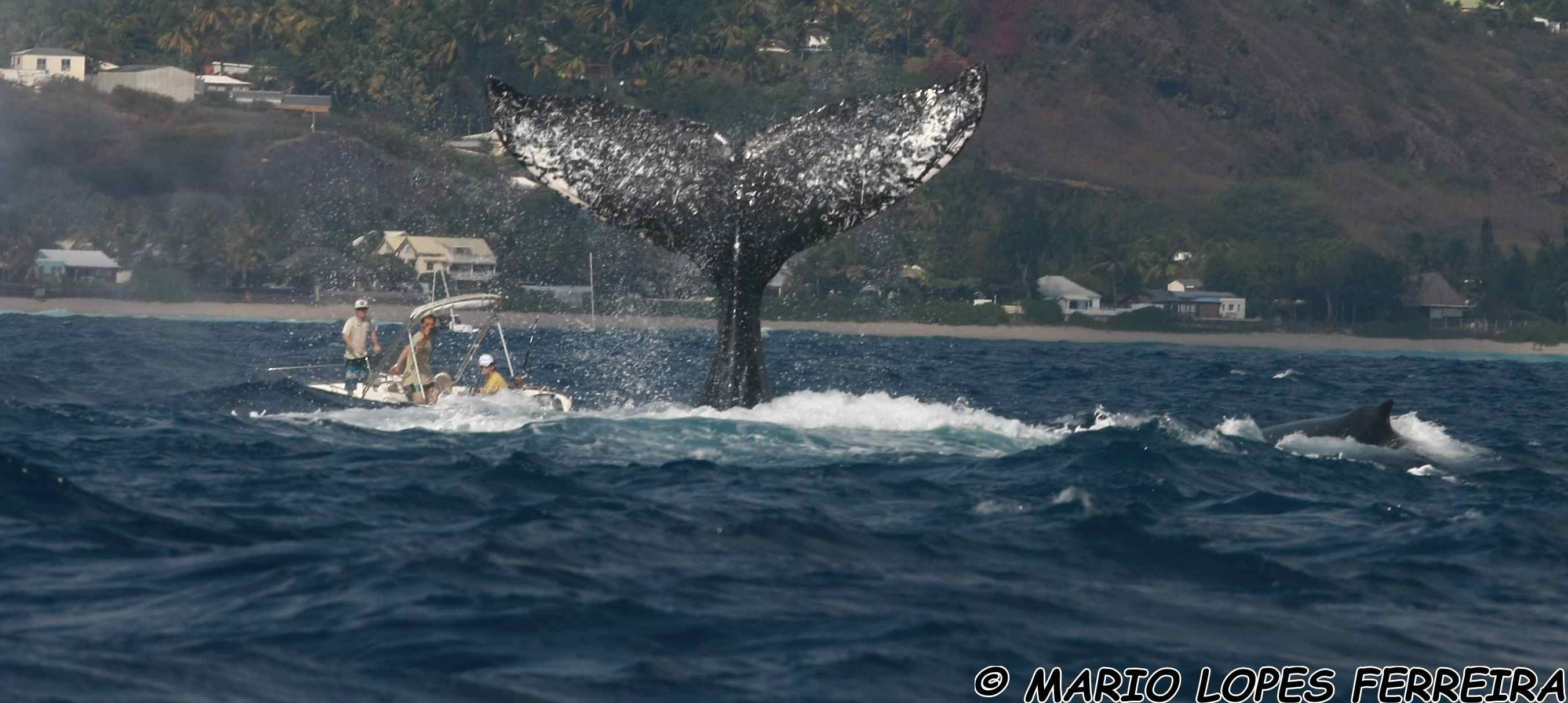
Humpback whales are main target for whale watching seasons (off St-Gilles).

The order Cetacea includes whales, dolphins and porpoises. They are the mammals most fully adapted to aquatic life with a spindle-shaped nearly hairless body, protected by a thick layer of blubber, and forelimbs and tail modified to provide propulsion underwater.

Rules of whale watching activities have been situated by OMAR (Observatoire Marin de la Réunion) and Globice (Groupe local d'observation et d'identification des cétacés).

- Suborder: Mysticeti
  - Family: Balaenopteridae
    - Subfamily: Balaenopterinae
      - Genus: Balaenoptera
        - Common minke whale, Balaenoptera acutorostrata LC
        - Antarctic minke whale, Balaenoptera bonaerensis DD
        - Bryde's whale, Balaenoptera edeni DD
        - Southern sei whale, Balaenoptera borealis schlegelii EN
        - Southern fin whale, Balaenoptera physalus quoyi EN
        - Pygmy blue whale, Balaenoptera musculus brevicauda DD
        - Southern blue whale, Balaenoptera musculus intermedia EN
    - Family: Megapterinae
      - Genus: Megaptera
        - Humpback whale, Megaptera novaeangliae LC
    - Family: Balaenidae
      - Genus: Eubalaena
        - Southern right whale, Eubalaena australis LC
- Suborder: Odontoceti
  - Family: Physeteridae
    - Genus: Physeter
      - Sperm whale, Physeter macrocephalus VU
  - Family: Kogiidae
    - Genus: Kogia
      - Pygmy sperm whale, Kogia breviceps DD
      - Dwarf sperm whale, Kogia sima DD
  - Family: Ziphidae
    - Genus: Indopacetus
      - Tropical bottlenose whale, Indopacetus pacificus DD
    - Genus: Ziphius
      - Cuvier's beaked whale, Ziphius cavirostris DD
    - Subfamily: Hyperoodontinae
      - Genus: Mesoplodon
        - Blainville's beaked whale, Mesoplodon densirostris DD
        - Gray's beaked whale, Mesoplodon grayi DD
        - Hector's beaked whale, Mesoplodon hectori DD
        - Layard's beaked whale, Mesoplodon layardii DD
        - True's beaked whale, Mesoplodon mirus DD
  - Superfamily: Delphinoidea
    - Family: Delphinidae (marine dolphins)
      - Genus: Steno
        - Rough-toothed dolphin, Steno bredanensis LC
      - Genus: Grampus
        - Risso's dolphin, Grampus griseus DD
      - Genus: Globicephala
        - Short-finned pilot whale, Globicephala macrorhynchus DD
      - Genus: Sousa
        - Indian humpback dolphin, Sousa plumbea NT
      - Genus: Tursiops
        - Indo-Pacific bottlenose dolphin, Tursiops aduncus DD
        - Common bottlenose dolphin, Tursiops truncatus LC
      - Genus: Stenella
        - Pantropical spotted dolphin, Stenella attenuata LC
        - Striped dolphin, Stenella coeruleoalba LC
        - Spinner dolphin, Stenella longirostris DD
      - Genus: Delphinus
        - Long-beaked common dolphin, Delphinus capensis DD
      - Genus: Lagenodelphis
        - Fraser's dolphin, Lagenodelphis hosei DD
      - Genus: Peponocephala
        - Melon-headed whale, Peponocephala electra DD
      - Genus: Pseudorca
        - False killer whale, Pseudorca crassidens DD
      - Genus: Feresa
        - Pygmy killer whale, Feresa attenuata DD
      - Genus: Globicephala
        - Short-finned pilot whale, Globicephala macrorhynchus DD
      - Genus: Orcinus
        - Orca, Orcinus orca DD

== See also ==
- Wildlife of Réunion
- List of extinct animals of Réunion
- List of chordate orders
- Lists of mammals by region
- List of prehistoric mammals
- Mammal classification
- List of mammals described in the 2000s
