= North Pacific fin whale =

- Size compared to an average human

Scientific classification
- Kingdom: Animalia
- Phylum: Chordata
- Class: Mammalia
- Order: Artiodactyla
- Infraorder: Cetacea
- Family: Balaenopteridae
- Genus: Balaenoptera
- Species: B. physalus
- Subspecies: B. p. velifera

Trinomial name
- Balaenoptera physalus velifera (Scammon, 1869)

Subspecies of whale

The North Pacific fin whale (Balaenoptera physalus velifera) is a subspecies of fin whale that lives in the North Pacific Ocean. Most experts consider the fin whales of the North Pacific to be a third subspecies—this was supported by a 2013 study, which found that the Northern Hemisphere northern fin whale was not composed of a single subspecies. At least one other subspecies of fin whale, the southern fin whale (B. p. quoyi), exists in the Southern Hemisphere.

== Size ==
Maximum reported figures are 22.9 m (75 ft) for males and 24.7 m (81 ft) for females in the North Pacific, while the longest reliably measured were 20.8 m (68 ft) and 22.9 m (75 ft) — all were caught off California, the former in the 1920s and the latter in the 1960s. At sexual maturity, males average 16.8–17.6 m (55–58 ft) in the North Atlantic and 17.4–17.7 m (57–58 ft) in the North Pacific, while females average 17.7–19.1 m (58–63 ft) in the North Atlantic and 18.3–18.6 m (60–61 ft) in the North Pacific. At birth, calves are 6.4 m (21 ft) in the North Pacific.

== Reproduction ==
Balaenoptera physalus velifera is December–January, while peak birthing is in November–December — in both the North Atlantic and North Pacific.
