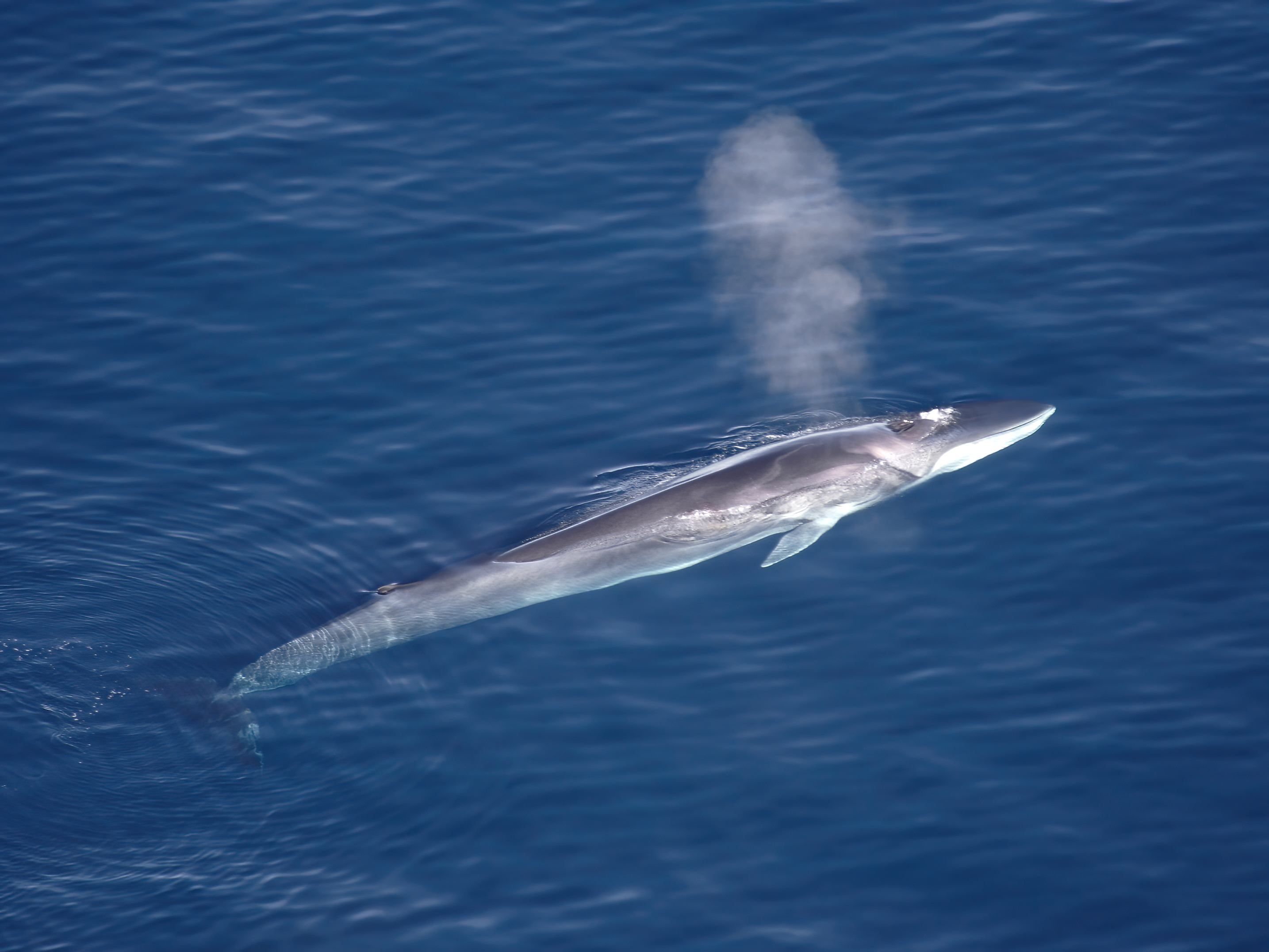
- A fin whale surfacing in waters around Greenland
- Size compared to an average human

Conservation status
- Vulnerable (IUCN 3.1)

- Vulnerable (NatureServe)
- CITES Appendix I

Scientific classification
- Kingdom: Animalia
- Phylum: Chordata
- Class: Mammalia
- Order: Artiodactyla
- Infraorder: Cetacea
- Family: Balaenopteridae
- Genus: Balaenoptera
- Species: B. physalus

Binomial name
- Balaenoptera physalus (Linnaeus, 1758)

Subspecies
- B. p. physalus; B. p. quoyi; B. p. velifera
- Fin whale range (in blue)

Synonyms
- List: Balaena physalus Linnaeus, 1758; Balaena boops Linnaeus, 1758; Balaena antiquorum Fischer, 1829; Balaena quoyi Fischer, 1829; Balaena musculus Companyo, 1830; Balaenoptera rorqual Lacépède, 1804; Balaenoptera gibbar Lacépède, 1804; Balaenoptera mediterraneensis Lesson, 1828; Balaenoptera jubartes Dewhurst, 1834; Balaenoptera australis Gray, 1846; Balaenoptera patachonicus Burmeister, 1865; Balaenoptera velifera Cope, 1869; Physalis vulgaris Fleming, 1828; Rorqualus musculus F. Cuvier, 1836; Pterobalaena communis Van Beneden, 1857

= Fin whale =

Fin whale Temporal range: Early Pleistocene – recent (1.3–0 Ma)

Large baleen whale species

The fin whale (Balaenoptera physalus), also known as the finback whale or common rorqual, is a species of baleen whale and the second-longest cetacean after the blue whale. The biggest individual reportedly measured 26–27.3 m (85–90 ft) in length, with a maximum recorded weight of 65.5 to 120 t (64.5 to 118.1 long tons; 72.2 to 132.3 short tons). The fin whale's body is long, slender, and brownish-gray in color, with a paler underside to appear less conspicuous from below (countershading).

At least two recognized subspecies exist, one in the North Atlantic and one across the Southern Hemisphere. The species is found in all the major oceans, from polar to tropical waters, and is absent only from waters close to the pack ice at the poles and relatively small areas of water away from the open ocean. The highest population density occurs in temperate and cool waters. Its prey mainly consists of smaller schooling fish, small squid, and crustaceans, including copepods and krill. Mating takes place in temperate, low-latitude seas during the winter. Fin whales are often observed in pods of 6–10 animals, with whom they communicate using frequency-modulated sounds, ranging from 16 to 40 hertz.

Like all other large whales, the fin whale was a prized kill during the "heyday" of whaling from 1840 to 1861. This remained so into the 20th century, but decades of overharvesting contributed to declining numbers through the late 20th century. Over 725,000 fin whales were reportedly taken from the Southern Hemisphere between 1905 and 1976. Postrecovery numbers of the southern subspecies are predicted to be less than 50% of the pre-whaling population, even by 2010, due to long-lasting impacts of whaling and slow recovery rates. In the North Atlantic, it is considered to be fully recovered from past exploitation, while in other oceans, it is still in the process of recovery. As of 2018, it was assessed as vulnerable by the International Union for the Conservation of Nature.

== Taxonomy ==
- Balaenopteridae
  - B. acutorostrata (minke whale)
  - - - B. musculus (blue whale)
      - B. borealis (sei whale)
    - - Eschrichtius robustus (gray whale)
      - - B. physalus (fin whale)
        - Megaptera novaeangliae (humpback whale)

A phylogenetic tree of six baleen whale species

The fin whale was first described by Friderich Martens in 1675 and by Paul Dudley in 1725. The former description was used as the primary basis for the species Balaena physalus by Carl Linnaeus in 1758. In 1804, Bernard Germain de Lacépède reclassified the species as Balaenoptera rorqual, based on a specimen that had stranded on Île Sainte-Marguerite (Cannes, France) in 1798. In 1830, Louis Companyo described a specimen that had been stranded near Saint-Cyprien, southern France, in 1828, as Balaena musculus. Most later authors followed him in using the specific name musculus, until Frederick W. True (1898) showed that it referred to the blue whale. In 1846, British taxonomist John Edward Gray described a 16.7 m (55 ft) specimen from the Falkland Islands as Balaenoptera australis. In 1865, German naturalist Hermann Burmeister described a roughly 15 m (49 ft) specimen, found near Buenos Aires about 30 years earlier, as Balaenoptera patachonicus. In 1903, Romanian scientist Emil Racoviță placed all these designations into Balaenoptera physalus. The word physalus comes from Greek φυσα 'breath', referring to the prominent blow of the species.

Fin whales are rorquals, members of the family Balaenopteridae, which includes the humpback whale, blue whale, Bryde's whale, sei whale, and minke whale. The family diverged from the other baleen whales in the suborder Mysticeti in the middle Miocene.

Recent DNA evidence indicates that the fin whale may be more closely related to the humpback whale (Megaptera novaeangliae), and in at least one study, the gray whale (Eschrichtius robustus), two whales in different genera, than it is to members of its own genus, such as the minke whale. As of 2023, four subspecies are named, each with distinct physical features and vocalizations. The northern fin whale, B. p. physalus (Linnaeus 1758) inhabits the North Atlantic and the southern fin whale, B. p. quoyi (Fischer 1829) occupies the Southern Hemisphere. Most experts consider the fin whales of the North Pacific to be a third subspecies—this was supported by a 2013 study, which found that the Northern Hemisphere B. p. physalus was not composed of a single subspecies. A 2019 genetic study concluded that the North Pacific fin whales should be considered a subspecies, suggesting the name B. p. velifera (Scammon 1869). The three groups rarely mix.

Clarke (2004) proposed a "pygmy" subspecies (B. p. patachonica, Burmeister, 1865) that is purportedly darker in colour and has black baleen. He based this on a single physically mature 19.8 m (65 ft) female caught in the Antarctic in 1947–48, the slightly smaller average size of sexually and physically mature fin whales caught by the Japanese around 50°S, and the smaller, darker, sexually immature fin whales caught in the Antarctic, which he believed were a "migratory phase" of his proposed subspecies. The subspecies has not been genetically established, and is not recognized by the Society for Marine Mammalogy.

=== Hybrids ===
The genetic distance between blue and fin whales has been compared to that between a chimpanzee and human (3.5 million years on the evolutionary tree). Nevertheless, hybrid individuals between blue and fin whales, with characteristics of both, are known to occur with relative frequency in both the North Atlantic and North Pacific. The substantial overlap in both distribution and diet, and the fact that fin and blue whales often join in mixed schools, likely explains the apparently high frequency of hybridisation.

The DNA profile of a sampling of whale meat in the Japanese market found evidence of blue/fin hybrids. Similarly, a whale caught by whalers off the coast of Iceland in 2018 was found to be a hybrid descended from a female blue whale and a male fin whale. A 2024 genome analysis of North Atlantic blue whales found that about 3.5% of their genome was derived from hybridization with fin whales. The gene flow was determined to be unidirectional from fin to blue whales. Despite their smaller size, fin whales have similar cruising and sprinting speeds to blue whales, which would allow fin males to complete courtship chases with blue females.

== Anatomy ==
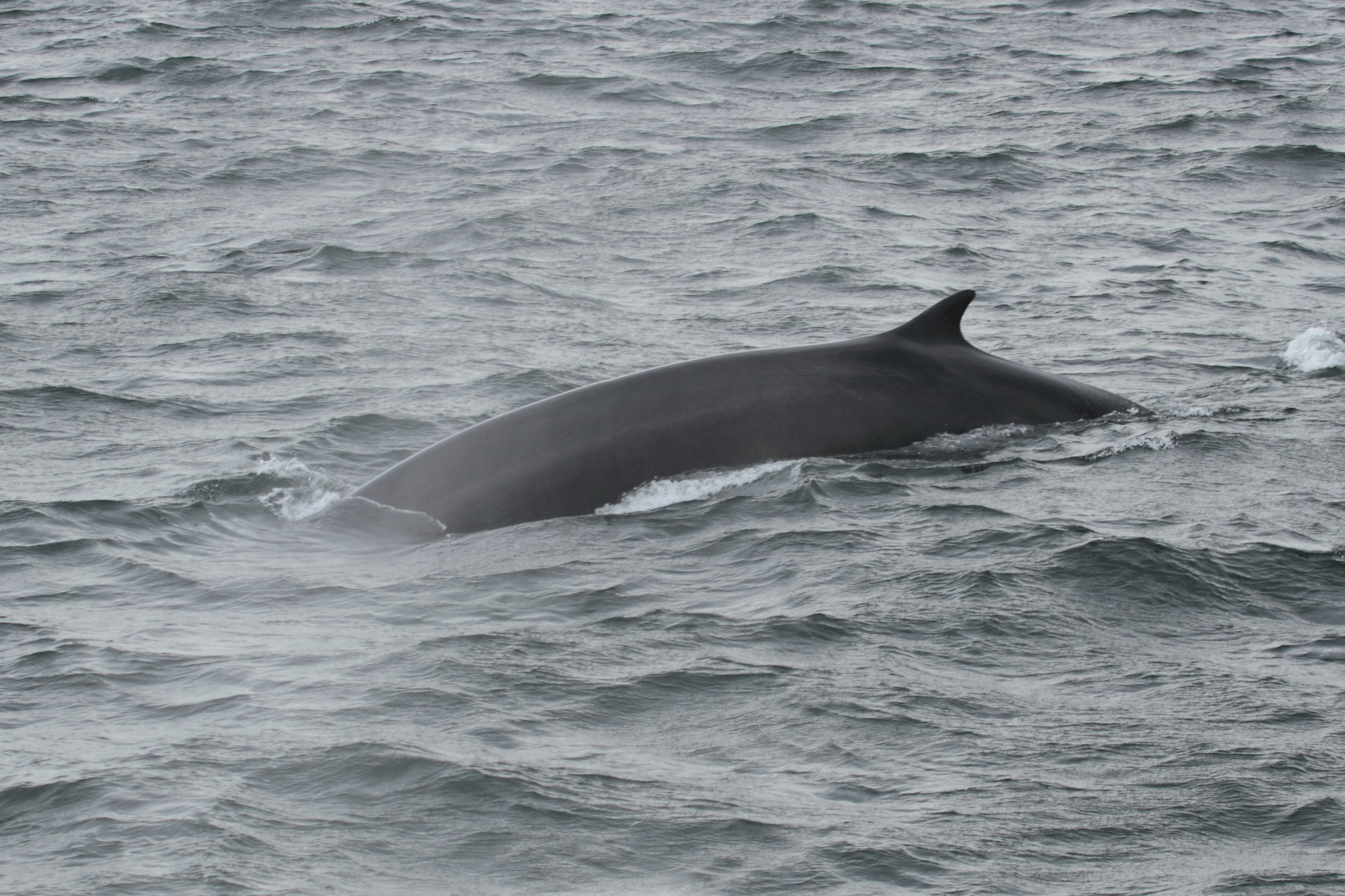
A fin whale in the Gulf of St. Lawrence, showing characteristic backswept dorsal fin

The fin whale is relatively slender, with a slim back and a large, hook-shaped dorsal fin measuring 61 cm (24 in), located on the fourth posterior end of the body. It has an elongated ridge on its back and around 260 to 480 baleen plates. It has two blowholes that can squirt 4–6 m (13–20 ft) up in the air. Like most rorquals, the fin whale has grooves between the tip of the lower jaw and the navel.

Among whale species, the fin whale is exceeded in size only by the blue whale. Adults usually average 36–45 t (35–44 long tons; 40–50 short tons) in weight. Males have a mean length of 21 m (69 ft), and females average 22 m (72 ft). They are sexually dimorphic, with females generally being longer and heavier than males. The largest specimens can attain lengths of over 26–27 m (85–89 ft) and weights of 65.5–80 t (64.5–78.7 long tons; 72.2–88.2 short tons). The record length was measured at 27.3 m (90 ft). The Discovery Committee reported lengths up to 27 m (88 ft). However, the longest fin whale ever scientifically measured was a 25.9 m (85 ft) female caught south of Antarctica in the Southern Indian Ocean, as verified by Major F. A. Spencer, a whaling inspector aboard the whaling ship Southern Princess (1936–38). The fin whale is estimated to have weighed up to 120 tonnes (130 short tons). Fin whales from the Northern Hemisphere are smaller than their southern counterparts and reach a body length of around 22.5 m (74 ft) for females and 21.5 m (71 ft) for males.

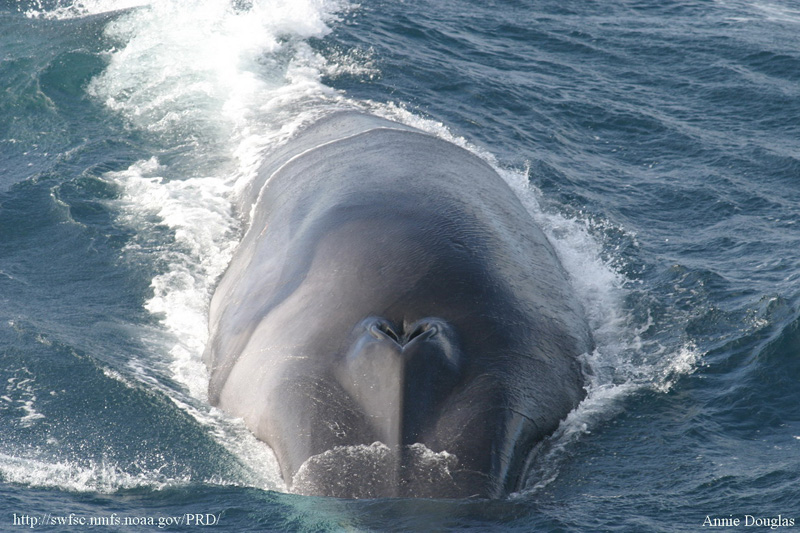
A frontal view of a fin whale, showing asymmetrical colouration

The fin whale is brownish to dark or light gray dorsally and white ventrally. The left side of the head is dark gray, while the right side exhibits a complex pattern of contrasting light and dark markings. The right lower jaw is white or light gray, which sometimes extends laterally and dorsally unto the upper jaw. Dark, oval-shaped areas of pigment called "flipper shadows" extend below and posterior to the pectoral fins.

The skull is 4.5–5 m (15–16 ft) long and weighs 1.5 t (1.5 long tons; 1.7 short tons). The ribs had a maximum straight length of 2.21 m (87 in). The liver and heart are the largest of any known animal, weighing between 230–600 kg (510–1,320 lb) for the liver and 130–290 kg (290–640 lb) for the heart. The kidneys are also large, weighing between 50–110 kg (110–240 lb), and the right lung is about 10% heavier than the left, weighing between 100–160 kg (220–350 lb) each.

The fin whale's penis typically measures 1.3 m (4 ft 3 in), with a maximum length of 1.74 m (5 ft 9 in); the testes usually weigh 1–3 kg (2.2–6.6 lb) in mature individuals. The oral cavity of the fin whale has a very stretchy or extensible nerve system, which aids them in feeding. An intersex fin whale was caught in South Georgia with several interesting features, including a connected testis and uterus and a severely deformed clitoris.

In one study, a fin whale brain measured 25 cm (9.8 in) long and 28 cm (11 in) wide at the tips of the temporal lobes and weighed around 5.2 kg (11 lb). The encephalization quotient (EQ) of the fin whale was measured at 0.14.

== Life history ==
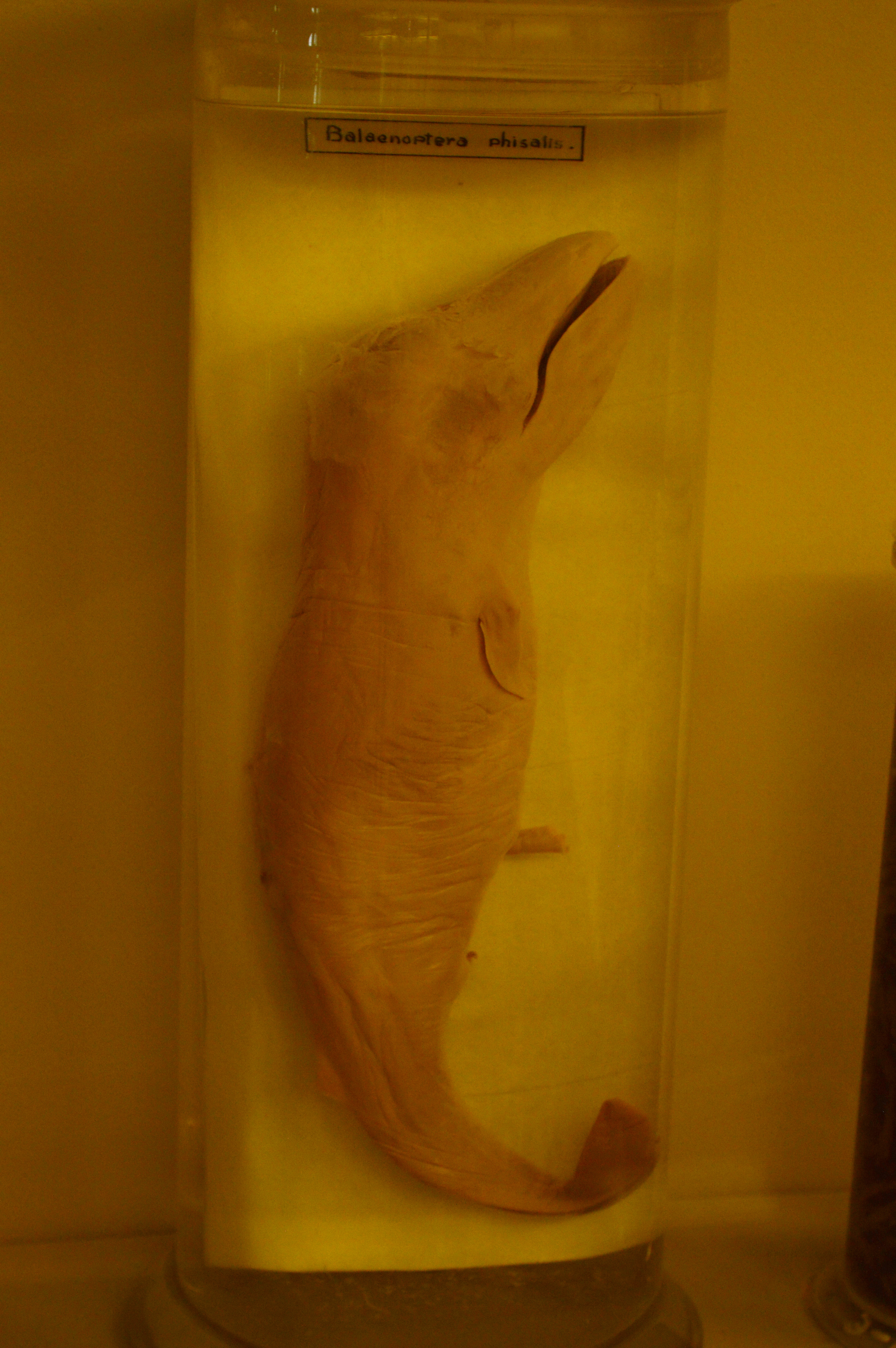
Fin whale embryo

Mating takes place during the winter, in temperate, low-latitude waters, and the gestation period lasts between 11 and 12 months. The length of the young at birth is 6–6.5 m (20–21 ft). At 6 to 7 months of age, when it is 11–12 m (36–39 ft) in length, a newborn weans from its mother, and the calf accompanies its mother to the summer feeding area. Calves remain with their mothers for about a year. Although reports of up to six foetuses have been made, single births are far more typical. In the Northern Hemisphere, females reach sexual maturity between the ages of 6 and 12, at lengths of 17.7–19 m (58–62 ft), and around 20 m (66 ft) in the Southern Hemisphere. Males reach sexual maturity at 6–10 years.

Full physical maturity is attained between 22 and 25 years. Fin whales live, on average, to 75–90 years. The fin whales studied in one 1958 study were estimated to be either 50 years old or 60–67 years old. Three fin whales, killed as part of a commercial hunt in Iceland in 2013 and 2015, were found to be aged 82, 80, and 65. Some studies have recorded individual whales living longer: one, studied near Iceland in 1988, was estimated to be 94 years old; a 1979 study recorded the maximum lifespan as 114 years; and a female specimen, which was found in 2010, measured 17.6 m (58 ft) in length and weighed 30 t (30 long tons; 33 short tons), was estimated to be 135–140 years old.

The fin whale, one of the fastest cetaceans, can sustain speeds between 37 km/h (23 mph) and 41 km/h (25 mph). Speeds up to 46–50 km/h (29–31 mph) have been recorded, earning the fin whale the nickname "the greyhound of the sea". The maximum speed measured by methods such as satellite tracking or GPS was 40 km/h (25 mph). The American naturalist Roy Chapman Andrews has pointed out that the fin whale, like the blue whale, has more endurance and power compared to the sei whale.

Fin whales are more gregarious than other rorquals and often live in groups of 6–10, although feeding groups may reach up to 100–250 animals.

=== Vocalizations ===
Multimedia relating to the fin whale
The whale calls have been sped up 10x from their original speed.

A fin whale song
Recorded in the Atlantic

Like other whales, males make long, loud, low-frequency sounds. The vocalizations of blue and fin whales are the lowest-frequency sounds made by any animal. Most sounds are frequency-modulated (FM) down-swept infrasonic pulses from 16 to 40 hertz frequency; the range of sounds that most humans can hear falls between 20 hertz and 20 kilohertz. Each sound lasts 1-2 seconds, and various sound combinations occur in patterned sequences lasting 7 to 15 minutes each. The whale then repeats the sequences in bouts, which can last for several days. The vocal sequences have source levels of up to 160–186 decibels relative to 1 micropascal at a reference distance of one metre and can be detected hundreds of miles from their source.

When fin whale sounds were first recorded by US biologists, they did not realize that these unusually loud, long, pure, and regular sounds were being made by whales. They first investigated the possibilities that the sounds were due to equipment malfunction, geophysical phenomena, or even part of a Soviet scheme for detecting enemy submarines. Eventually, biologists demonstrated that the sounds were the vocalizations of fin whales.

Direct association of these vocalizations with the reproductive season for the species, and because only males make the sounds, point to these vocalizations as possible reproductive displays. Over the past 100 years, the dramatic increase in ocean noise from shipping and naval activity may have slowed the recovery of the fin whale population, by impeding communications between males and receptive females. Fin whale songs can penetrate over 2,500 m (8,200 ft) below the seafloor and seismologists can use those song waves to assist in underwater surveys.

=== Breathing ===
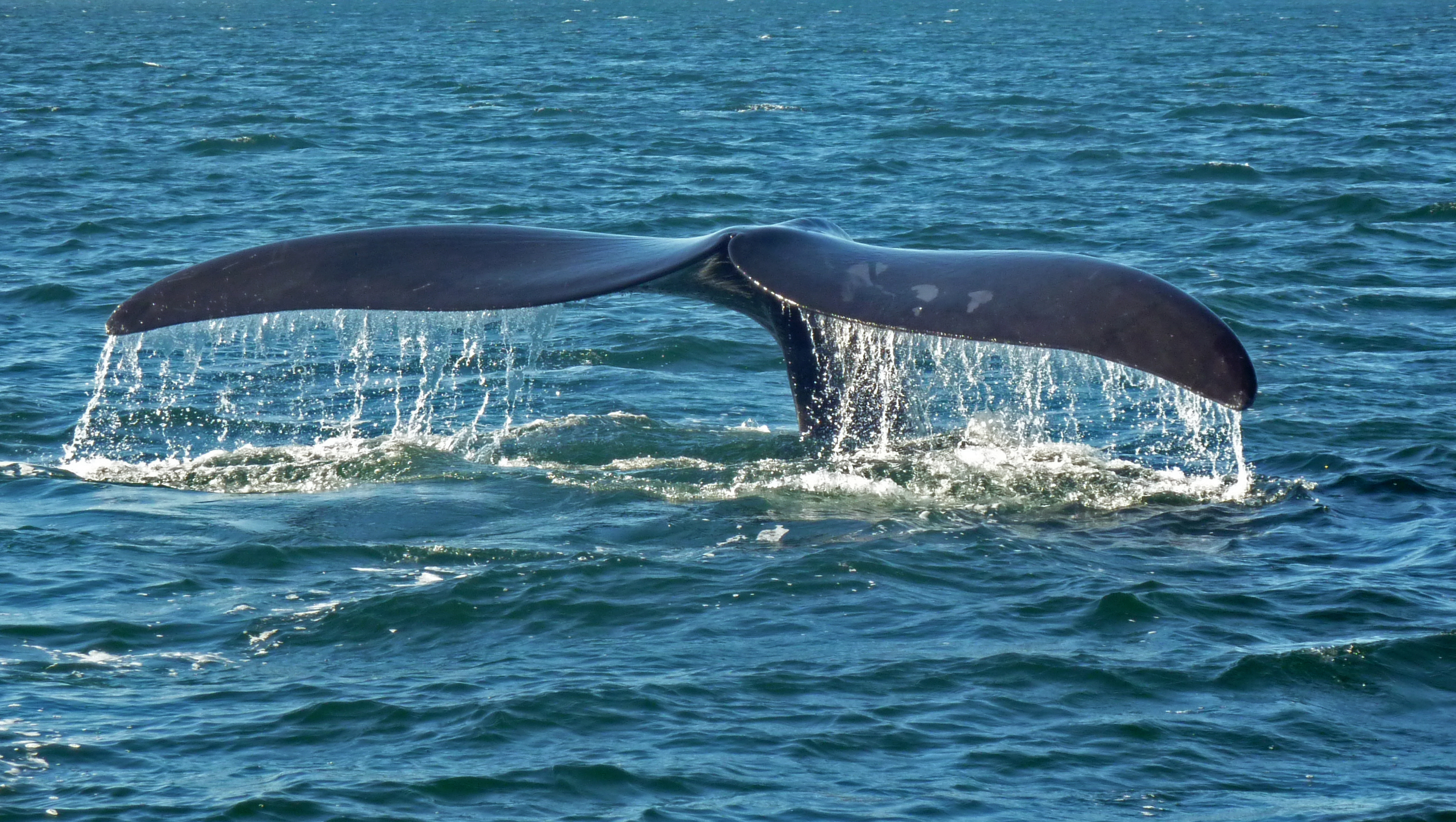
Lobtailing near the Valdés Peninsula, Argentina

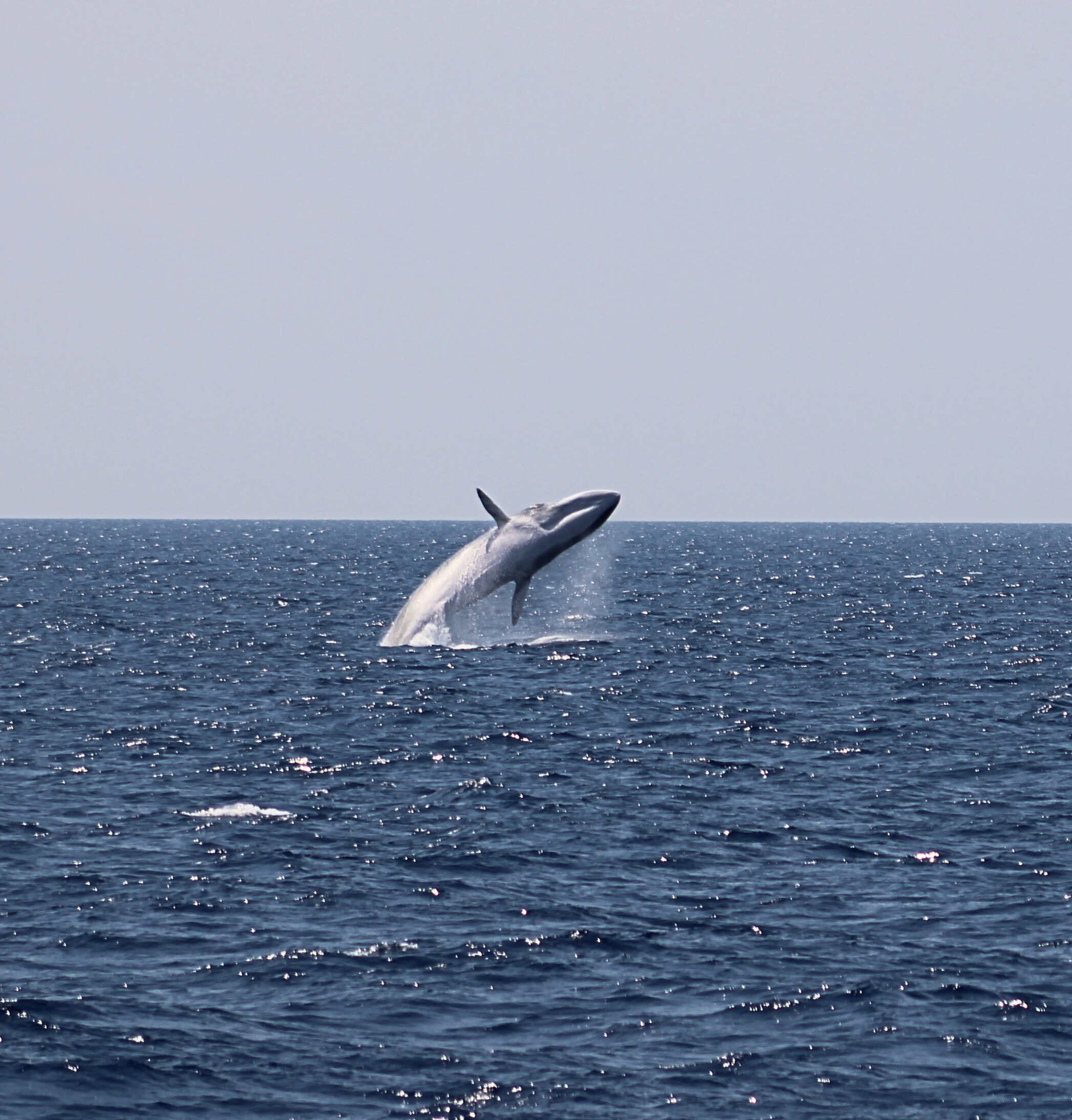
Fin whale breaching

When feeding, fin whales blow five to seven times in quick succession, but blow once every minute or two while traveling or resting. On their terminal (last) dive they arch their back high out of the water, but rarely raise their flukes out of the water. They then dive down as deep as 316 m (1,037 ft) when feeding, or around 100 m when resting or traveling. The average feeding dive off California and Baja lasts 6 minutes, with the maximum being almost 17 minutes; when traveling or resting, they usually dive for only a few minutes at a time.

== Ecology ==
=== Range and habitat ===
Like many large rorquals, the fin whale is a cosmopolitan species. It is found in all the world's major oceans and in waters ranging from the polar to the tropical. It is absent only from waters close to the ice pack at both the north and south extremities and relatively small areas of water away from the large oceans, such as the Red Sea, although they can reach into the Baltic Sea, a marginal sea of such conditions. The highest population density occurs in temperate and cool waters. It is less densely populated in the warmest, equatorial regions.

The North Atlantic fin whale has an extensive distribution, occurring from the Gulf of Mexico and Mediterranean Sea, northward to Baffin Bay and Spitsbergen. In general, fin whales are more common north of roughly 30°N latitude, but considerable confusion arises about their occurrence south of 30°N latitude, because of the difficulty in distinguishing fin whales from Bryde's whales. Extensive ship surveys have led researchers to conclude that the summer feeding range of fin whales in the western North Atlantic is mainly between 30ºN and 51°N, from shore seaward to the 1,000 fathoms (6,000 ft; 1,800 m) contour.

Summer distribution of fin whales in the North Pacific is the immediate offshore waters from central Baja California to Japan and as far north as the Chukchi Sea, bordering the Arctic Ocean. They occur in high densities in the northern Gulf of Alaska and southeastern Bering Sea between May and October, with some movement through the Aleutian passes into and out of the Bering Sea. Several whales tagged between November and January off southern California were killed in the summer off central California, Oregon, and British Columbia, and in the Gulf of Alaska. Fin whales have been observed feeding 250 mi (400 km) south of Hawaii in mid-May, and several winter sightings have been made there. Some researchers have suggested that the whales migrate into Hawaiian waters primarily in the autumn and winter.

Although fin whales are certainly migratory, moving seasonally in and out of high-latitude feeding areas, their overall migration pattern is not well understood. Acoustic readings from passive-listening hydrophone arrays indicate that a southward migration of the North Atlantic fin whale occurs in the autumn, from the Labrador-Newfoundland region, south past Bermuda, and into the West Indies. One or more populations of fin whales are thought to remain year-round in high latitudes, moving offshore, but not southward, in late autumn. A study based on resightings of identified fin whales in Massachusetts Bay indicates that calves often learn migratory routes from their mothers and return to their mother's feeding area in subsequent years.

In the Pacific, migration patterns are poorly characterized. Although some fin whales are apparently present year-round in the Gulf of California, a significant increase occurs in their numbers in the winter and spring. Southern fin whales migrate seasonally, from relatively high-latitude Antarctic feeding grounds in the summer to low-latitude breeding and calving areas in the winter. The location of their winter breeding areas is still unknown, since these whales tend to migrate in the open ocean.

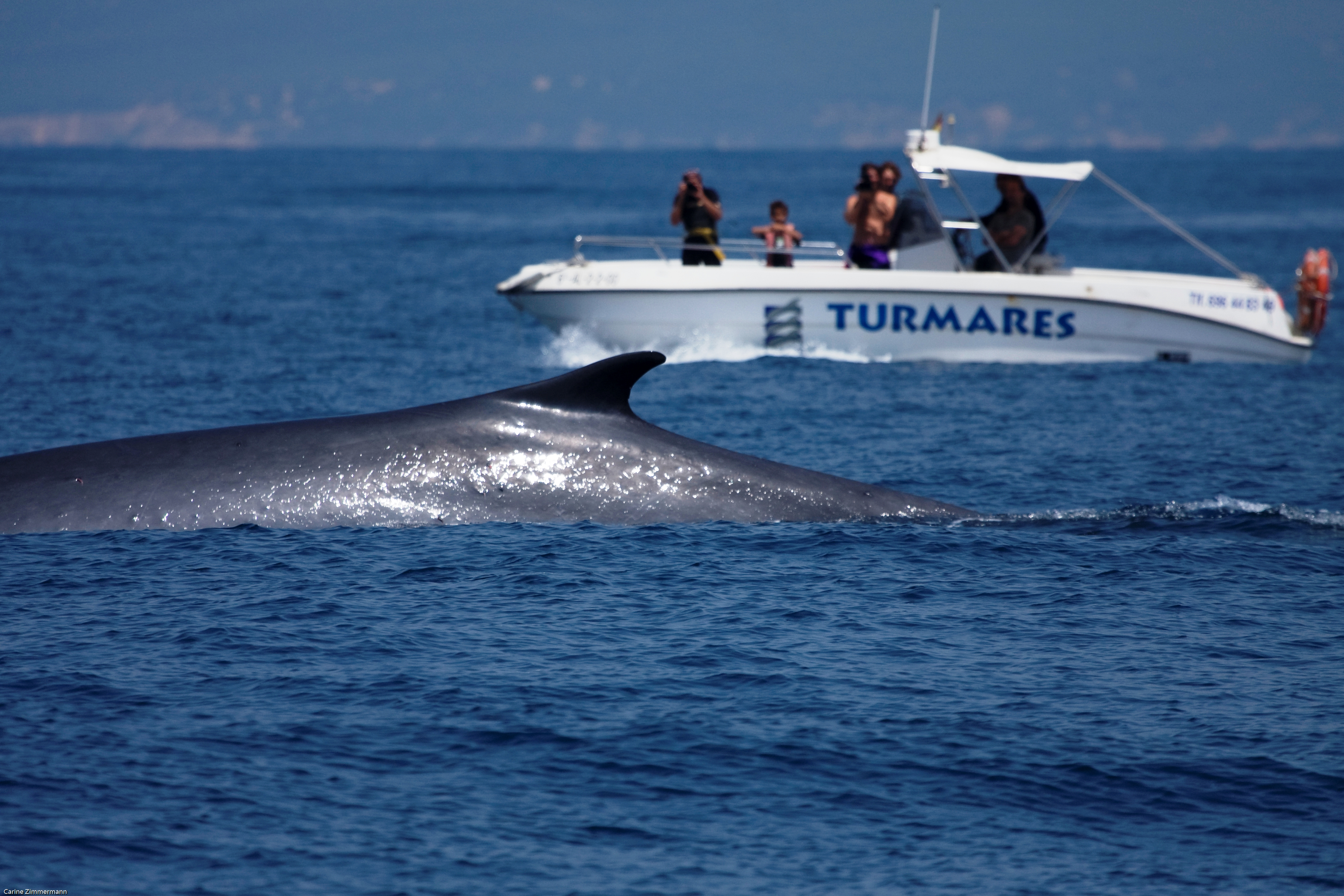
Fin whale and a boat in the Strait of Gibraltar

Populations of fin whales within the Mediterranean have been shown to prefer feeding locations that partially overlap with high concentrations of plastic pollution and microplastic debris. High concentrations of microplastics most likely overlap with fin whales' preferred feeding grounds, because both microplastic and the whale's food sources are near high trophic upwelling areas.

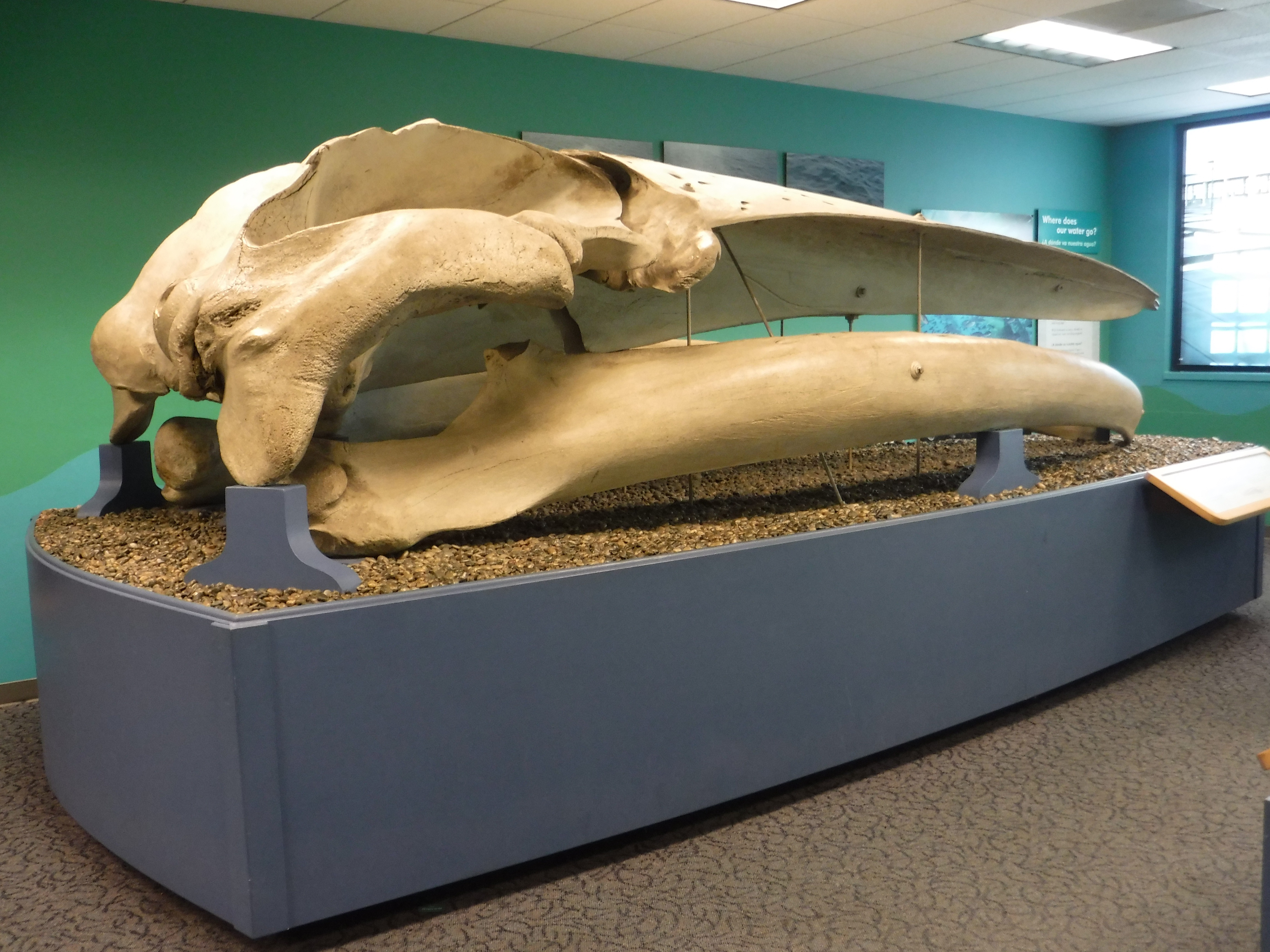
Fin whale skull, at San Diego Natural History Museum

The total historical North Pacific population was estimated at 42,000 to 45,000, before the start of whaling. Of this, the population in the eastern portion of the North Pacific was estimated to be 25,000 to 27,000. Surveys conducted in 1991, 1993, 1996, and 2001 produced estimates between 1,600 and 3,200 off California and 280 and 380 off Oregon and Washington. Surveys in coastal waters of British Columbia, in the summers of 2004 and 2005, produced abundance estimates of approximately 500 animals. Fin whales might have started returning to the coastal waters off British Columbia (a sighting occurred in Johnstone Strait in 2011) and Kodiak Island. The size of the local population migrating to Hawaiian Archipelago is unknown.

Finbacks are also relatively abundant along the coast of Peru and Chile, most notably the coast of Los Lagos, including the Gulf of Corcovado in Chiloé National Park, Punta de Choros, the port of Mejillones, and Caleta Zorra. Year-round confirmations also indicate possible residents off pelagic north eastern to central Chile, around coastal Caleta Chañaral and Pingüino de Humboldt National Reserve, east of the Juan Fernández Islands, and northeast of Easter Island, and possible wintering grounds exist for the eastern south Pacific population.

In the northern Indian Ocean and Bay of Bengal, including the coasts of Sri Lanka, India, and Malaysia, sightings and older records of fin whales exist.

=== Predation ===
The only known predator of the fin whale is the killer whale, with at least 20 eyewitness and second-hand accounts of attack or harassment. They usually flee and offer little resistance to attack. Only a few confirmed fatalities have occurred. In October 2005, 16 killer whales attacked and killed a fin whale in the Canal de Ballenas, Gulf of California, after chasing it for about an hour. They fed on its sinking carcass for about 15 minutes before leaving the area. In June 2012, a pod of killer whales was seen in La Paz Bay, in the Gulf of California, chasing a fin whale for over an hour before finally killing it and feeding on its carcass. The whale bore numerous tooth rakes over its back and dorsal fin; several killer whales flanked it on either side, with one individual visible under water biting at its right lower jaw. In July 1908, a whaler reportedly saw two killer whales attack and kill a fin whale off western Greenland. In January 1984, seven were seen from the air circling, holding the flippers, and ramming a fin whale in the Gulf of California, but the observation ended at nightfall. In January 2019, a pod of killer whales chased and attacked a 21 m (69 ft) long adult fin whale in San Luis Gonzaga Bay in the Gulf of California. The fin whale responded by slapping its tail against the killer whale, and the whale was eventually found stranded on a beach and later seen dead as the tide went out. A 2025 study included an 18 m (59 ft) long adult male and an immature female among the stranded fin whale individuals, presumed to have been eaten by orcas.

=== Feeding ===
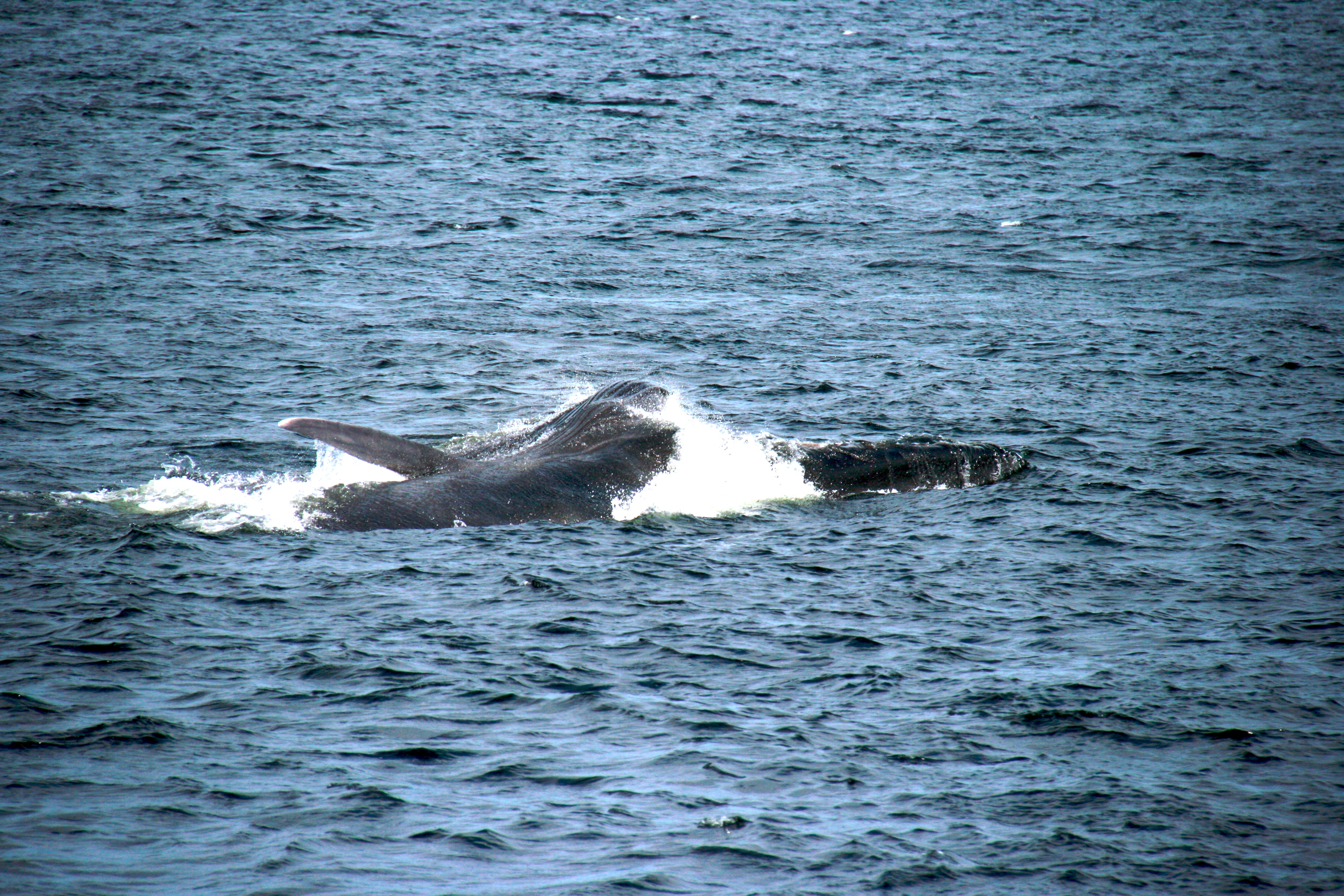
Fin whale lunge feeding at the surface

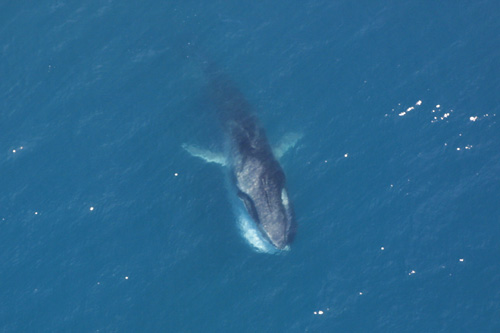
Fin whale near the surface after feeding

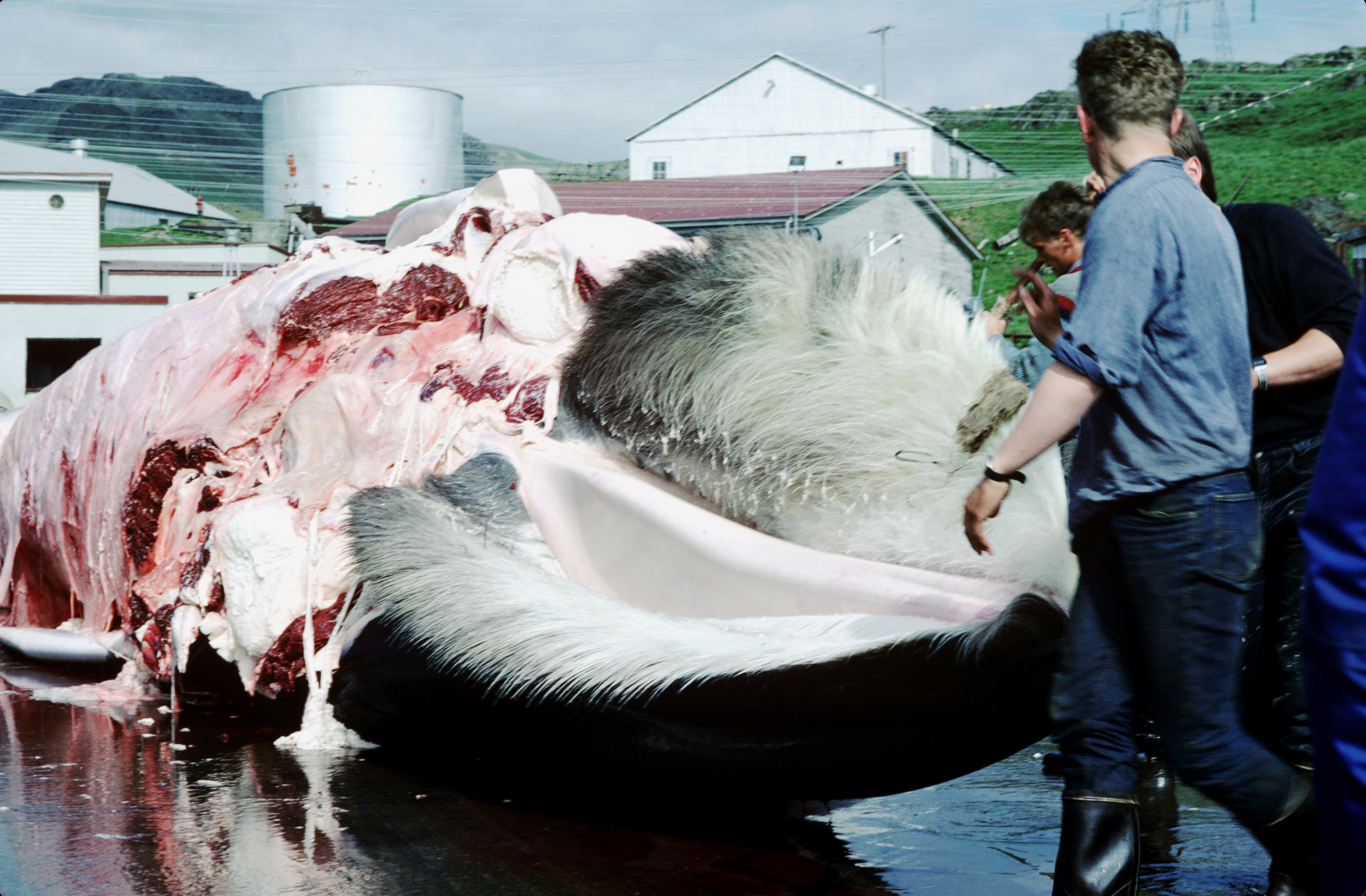
Fin whale being flensed at the Hvalfjörður whaling station in Iceland, showing the baleen bristles used to filter prey organisms

The fin whale is a filter feeder, consuming small schooling fish, squid, and crustaceans, including copepods and krill. In the North Pacific, they feed on krill in the genera Euphausia, Thysanoessa, and Nyctiphanes, large copepods in the genus Neocalanus, small schooling fish (such as the genera Engraulis, Mallotus, Clupea, and Theragra), and squid. Based on stomach-content analysis of over 19,500 fin whales caught by the Japanese whaling fleet in the North Pacific from 1952 to 1971, 64.1% contained only krill, 25.5% copepods, 5.0% fish, 3.4% krill and copepods, and 1.7% squid. A 1959 study, which studied the stomach contents of about 7500 fin whales caught in the northern North Pacific and Bering Sea from 1952 to 1958, found that they mainly preyed on euphausiids around the Aleutian Islands and in the Gulf of Alaska and schooling fish in the northern Bering Sea and off Kamchatka.

Of the fin whale stomachs sampled off British Columbia between 1963 and 1967, euphausiids dominated the diet for four of the five years (82.3 to 100% of the diet), while copepods only formed a major portion of the diet in 1965 (35.7%). Miscellaneous fish, squid, and octopus played only a very minor part of the diet in two of the five years (3.6 to 4.8%). Fin whales caught off California between 1959 and 1970 fed on the pelagic euphausiid Euphausia pacifica (86% of sampled individuals), the more neritic euphausiid Thysanoessa spinifera (9%), and the northern anchovy (Engraulis mordax) (7%); only trace amounts (<0.5% each) were found of Pacific saury (C. saira) and juvenile rockfish (Sebastes jordani).

In the North Atlantic, they prey on euphausiids in the genera Meganyctiphanes, Thysanoessa and Nyctiphanes and small schooling fish in the genera Clupea, Mallotus, and Ammodytes. Of the 1,609 fin whale stomachs examined at the Hvalfjörður whaling station in southwestern Iceland from 1967 to 1989 (caught between June and September), 96% contained only krill, 2.5% krill and fish, 0.8% some fish remains, 0.7% capelin (M. villosus), and 0.1% sandeel (family Ammodytidae); a small proportion of (mainly juvenile) blue whiting (Micromesistius poutassou) were also found. Of the krill sampled between 1979 and 1989, the vast majority (over 99%) was northern krill (Meganyctiphanes norvegica); only one stomach contained Thysanoessa longicaudata. Off West Greenland, 75% of the fin whales caught between July and October had consumed krill (family Euphausiidae), 17% capelin (Mallotus), and 8% sand lance (Ammodytes spp.). A study on the ecological niches of fin whales in Icelandic waters using stable isotopes showed that the fin whale has a strong overlap in diet and distribution with the blue whale and may compete with the humpback, sei, and minke whales for food. Off eastern Newfoundland, they chiefly feed on capelin, but also take small quantities of euphausiids (mostly T. raschii and T. inermis). In the Ligurian-Corsican-Provençal Basin, in the Mediterranean Sea, they make dives as deep as 34–184 m (112–604 ft) to feed on the euphausiid Meganyctiphanes norvegica while, off the island of Lampedusa, between Tunisia and Sicily, they have been observed in midwinter feeding on surface swarms of the small euphausiid Nyctiphanes couchi.

In the Southern Hemisphere, they feed almost exclusively on euphausiids (mainly the genera Euphausia and Thysanoessa), as well as taking small amounts of amphipods (e.g. Themisto gaudichaudii) and various species of fish. Of the more than 16,000 fin whales caught by the Japanese whaling fleet in the Southern Hemisphere between 1961 and 1965 that contained food in their stomachs, 99.4% fed on euphausiids, 0.5% on fish, and 0.1% on amphipods. In the Southern Ocean they mainly consume E. superba.

The animal feeds by opening its jaws while swimming at some 11 km/h (6.8 mph) in one study, which causes it to engulf up to 70 m^{3} (18,000 US gal; 15,000 imp gal) of water in one gulp. It then closes its jaws and pushes the water back out of its mouth through its baleen, which allows the water to leave while trapping the prey. An adult has between 262 and 473 baleen plates on each side of the mouth. Each plate is made of keratin that frays out into fine hairs on the ends inside the mouth near the tongue. Each plate can measure up to 76 cm (30 in) in length and 30 cm (12 in) in width.

The whale routinely dives deeper than 200 m (660 ft), where it executes an average of four "lunges" to accumulate krill. Each gulp provides the whale with around 10 kg (22 lb) of food. One whale can consume up to 1,800 kg (4,000 lb) of food a day, leading scientists to conclude that the whale spends about three hours a day feeding to meet its energy requirements, roughly the same as humans. If prey patches are not sufficiently dense or are located too deep in the water, the whale has to spend a larger portion of its day searching for food. One hunting technique is to circle schools of fish at high speed, frightening the fish into a tight ball, then turning on its side before engulfing the massed prey.

=== Parasites, epibiotics, and pathology ===
Fin whales are exposed to a variety of epibionts and parasites. The parasitic copepod Pennella balaenopterae—usually found on the flank of fin whales—burrows into their blubber to feed on their blood, while the pseudo-stalked barnacle Xenobalanus globicipitis is generally found more often on the dorsal fin, pectoral fins, and flukes.

Other barnacles found on fin whales include the acorn barnacle Coronula reginae and the stalked barnacle Conchoderma auritum, which attaches to Coronula or the baleen. The harpacticoid copepod Balaenophilus unisetus (heavy infestations of which have been found in fin whales caught off northwestern Spain) and the ciliate Haematophagus also infest the baleen, the former feeding on the baleen itself and the latter on red blood cells.

The remora Remora australis and occasionally the amphipod Cyamus balaenopterae can also be found on fin whales, both feeding on the skin. Infestations of the giant nematode Crassicauda boopis can cause inflammation of the renal arteries and potential kidney failure, while the smaller C. crassicauda infects the lower urinary tract. Of 87 whales taken and necropsied from the North Atlantic, infection from Crassicauda boopis was found to be very prevalent and invasive, indicating high probability that it was responsible for causing death in these whales. C. boopis was found in 94% of the whales examined. The worms were usually enveloped by "exuberant tissue reactions which in some whales obstructed multiple renal veins". The parasite was most likely acquired via environmental contamination, involving shedding of larvae in urine. Major inflammatory lesions in the mesenteric arteries suggested that the worm larvae were ingested and migrated to the kidney.

These observations suggest that infection from C. boopis can be "lethal by inducing congestive renal failure". Injury to the vascular system is also a result of moderate infections. Therefore, the implication can be made that the feeding migration of fin whales every year in circumpolar waters can be associated with pathologic risk.

An emaciated 13 m (43 ft) female fin whale, which stranded along the Belgian coast in 1997, was found to be infected with lesions of Morbillivirus. In January 2011, a 16.7 m (55 ft) emaciated adult male fin whale, stranded dead on the Tyrrhenian coastline of Italy, was found to be infected with Morbillivirus and the protozoa Toxoplasma gondii, as well as carrying heavy loads of organochlorine pollutants.

== Human interaction ==
=== Whaling ===
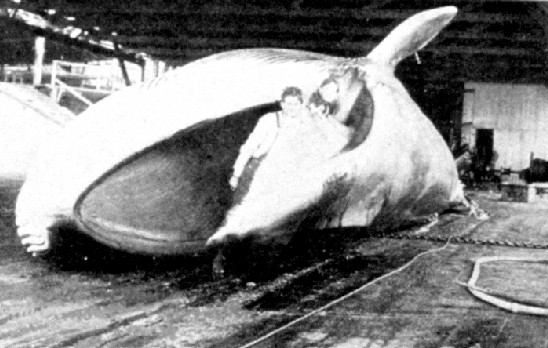
A fin whale caught at Grays Harbor c. 1912

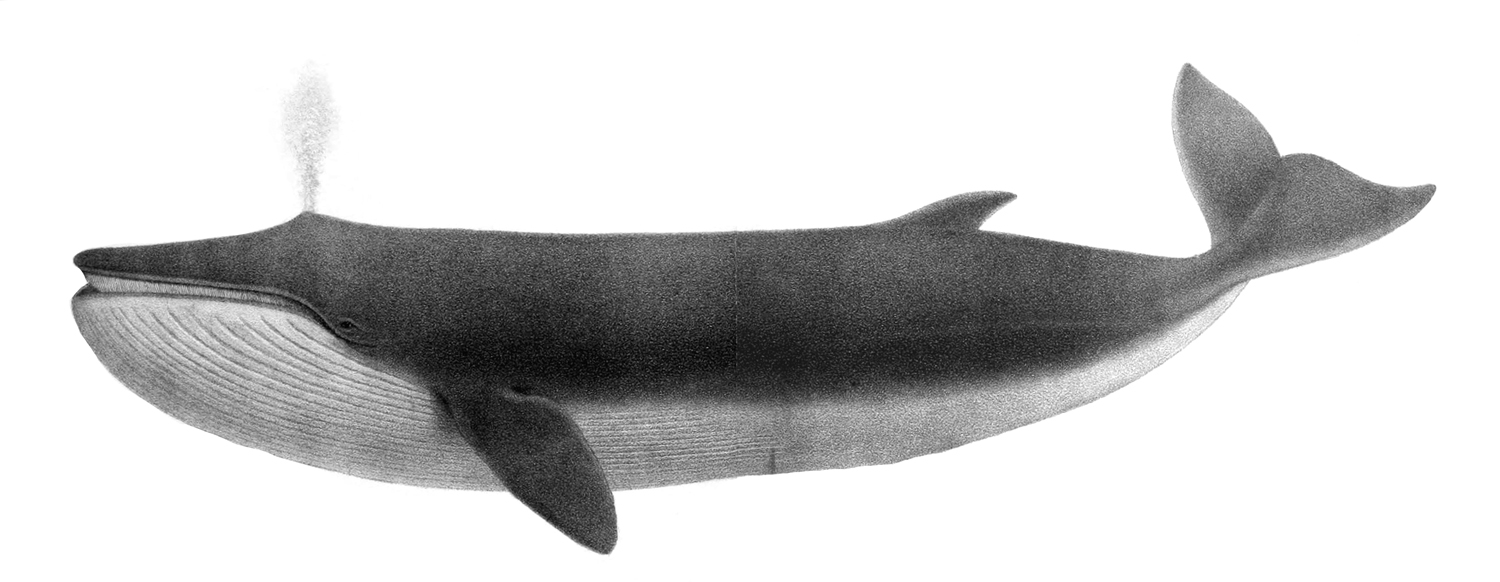
"The Finback" (Balaenoptera velifera, Cope) from Charles Melville Scammon's Marine Mammals of the North-western coast of North America (1874)

In the 19th century, the fin whale was occasionally hunted by open-boat whalers, but it was relatively safe, because it could easily outrun ships of the time and often sank when killed, making the pursuit a waste of time for whalers. However, the later introduction of steam-powered boats and harpoons that exploded on impact made killing and securing them, along with blue and sei whales, possible on an industrial scale. As other whale species became overhunted, the whaling industry turned to the still-abundant fin whale as a substitute. It was primarily hunted for its blubber, oil, and baleen. Around 704,000 fin whales were caught in Antarctic whaling operations alone between 1904 and 1975.

The introduction of factory ships with stern slipways in 1925 substantially increased the number of whales taken per year. During the 20th century, fin whales were a major target of whaling worldwide. In total, some 874,000 individuals were captured, of which 726,000 were in the Southern Hemisphere, 75,000 in the North Pacific, and 72,000 in the North Atlantic. In the 1960s, fin whales became scarce and were partially substituted in the catch by sei whales. In the North Pacific, Japan took 300 to 400 fin whales per year in the Sea of Japan and East China Sea in the 1910s, and 100 to 200 per year in the 1920s. After World War II, Korean whaling companies began hunting fin whales in these waters, and China and North Korea may have joined the hunt. By the 1960s, however, the number of whales caught declined sharply due to population decline, and minke whales became the primary target in these waters.

The International Whaling Commission (IWC) prohibited hunting in the Southern Hemisphere in 1976. The Soviet Union engaged in the illegal killing of protected whale species in the North Pacific and Southern Hemisphere, overreporting fin whale catches to cover up illegal takes of other species. The fin whale was given full protection from commercial whaling by the IWC in the North Pacific in 1976. In 1982, the IWC adopted the moratorium on commercial whaling, which came into force in 1986, with small exceptions for aboriginal catches and catches for research purposes. Under this scheme, the IWC has set a quota of 19 fin whales per year for Greenland. Meat and other products from whales killed in these hunts are widely marketed within Greenland, but export is illegal. With respect to commercial whaling, the moratorium led to the closure of many whaling operations worldwide and marked the end of fin whale hunting by Spain. However, arguing that the measure had been approved as a temporary measure of only five years and lacked a robust scientific basis, Iceland lodged a reservation to the moratorium and has continued to hunt fin whales under national quotas to this day. In the Southern Hemisphere, Japan took a total of 18 fin whales under its Antarctic Special Permit whaling program during the period 2005–2011. Afterward, and for reasons similar to those given by Iceland, Japan withdrew from the IWC in 2019 and resumed fin whale hunting in the North Pacific, taking 30 whales in 2024.

=== Effects of pollution ===
Fin whales typically live far offshore and occupy the lower levels of the food web, thus avoiding the biomagnification of chemical pollutants. As a result, the concentration of chemical pollutants in their tissues are generally low compared to other cetaceans. However, organochlorine pollutants, such as DDTs and polychlorinated biphenyls (PCBs), have been detected in measurable concentrations in their blubber, muscle, and liver. Moreover, these compounds have been shown to cross the placental barrier, reaching the fetus, and are transmitted through lactation, thus raising concern about their potential impact on reproduction. In recent years, ecotoxicological studies on this species have mostly focused on novel contaminants, such as organophosphates, flame retardants, phthalates, and other plasticizers. Since the fin whale is a filter-feeding species, research has also addressed the potential impact of microplastics on the various populations.

=== Ship interaction ===
Collisions with ships are a major cause of mortality. In some areas, they cause a substantial portion of large whale strandings. Most serious injuries are caused by large, fast-moving ships over or near continental shelves.

A 60 ft (18 m) fin whale was found stuck on the bow of a container ship in New York Harbor on 12 April, 2014. Two dead fin whales, one 65 ft (20 m) and one 25 ft (7.6 m), were discovered stuck to the Australian destroyer HMAS Sydney in May 2021 when the ship arrived in Naval Base San Diego.

Ship collisions frequently occur in Tsushima Strait and result in damage done to whales, passengers, and vessels. In response, the Japanese Coast Guard has started a surveillance program that monitors large cetacean activity in the strait, to keep operating vessels in the area updated.

=== Whale watching ===
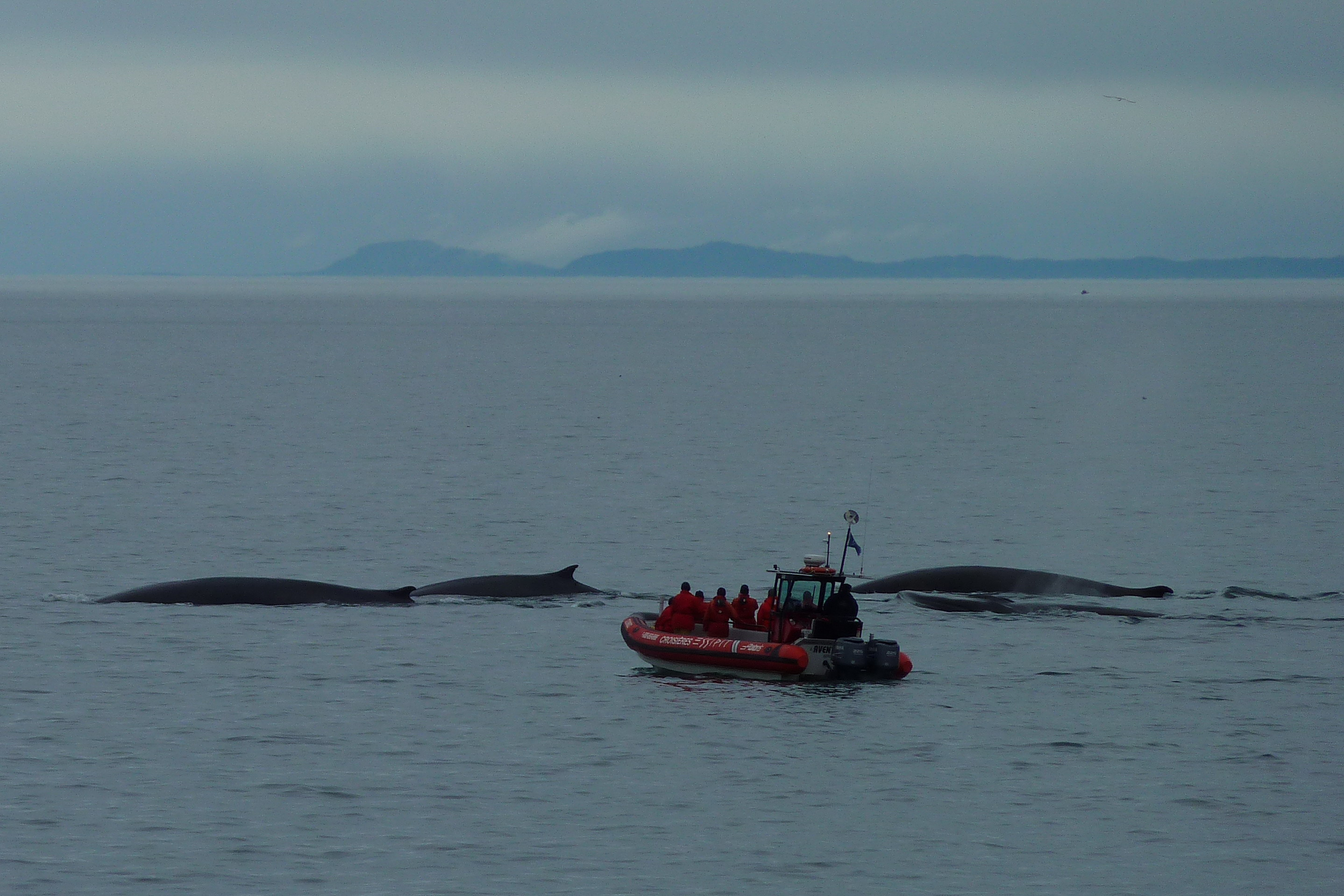
People in a Zodiac watching several fin whales off Tadoussac

Fin whales are regularly encountered on whale watching excursions worldwide. In Monterey Bay and the Southern California Bight, fin whales are encountered year-round, with the best sightings between November and March. They can even be seen from land, such as at Point Vicente, Palos Verdes, where they can be seen lunge feeding at the surface only a half mile to a few miles offshore. They are regularly sighted in the summer and fall in the Gulf of St. Lawrence, the Gulf of Maine, the Bay of Fundy, the Bay of Biscay, Strait of Gibraltar, and the Mediterranean. In southern Ireland, they are seen inshore from June to February, with peak sightings in November and December.

=== Conservation ===
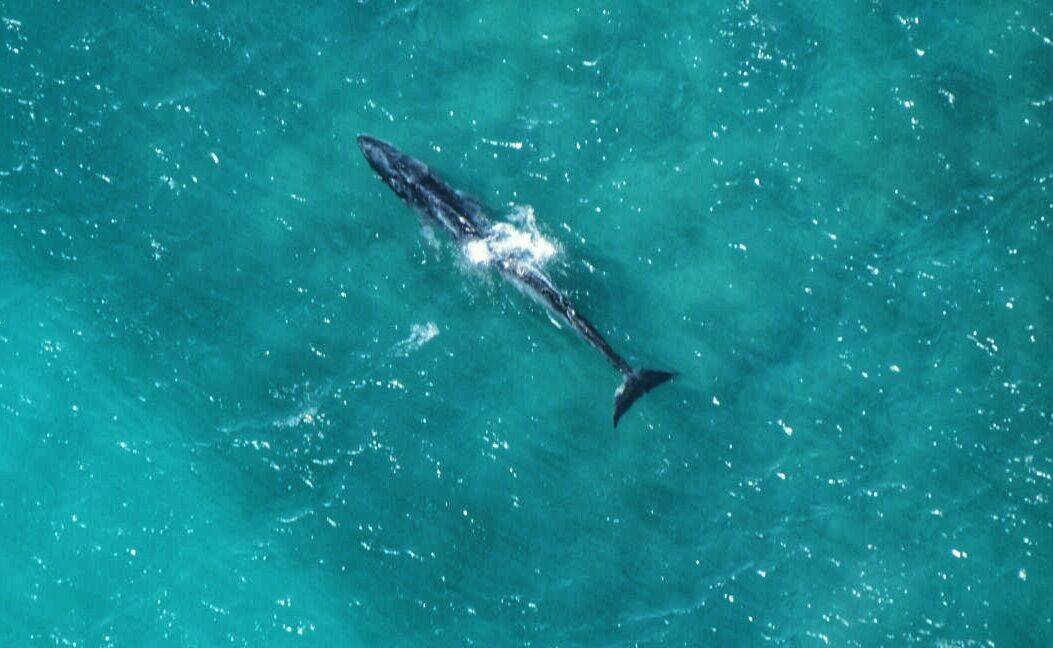
An immature fin whale in distress off the national park of Caesarea Maritima

As of 2018, the global fin whale population is estimated to be 100,000–140,000 mature individuals. An estimated total of 70,000 individuals are in the North Atlantic, 50,000 in the North Pacific, and 25,000 in the Southern Hemisphere.

The fin whale is listed as a vulnerable species on the IUCN Red List. They are also included in the Endangered Species Act of 1973. The fin whale is listed on both Appendix I and Appendix II of the Convention on the Conservation of Migratory Species of Wild Animals (CMS), and on Appendix I of the Convention on International Trade in Endangered Species of Wild Fauna and Flora (CITES).

Alongside hunting, pollution, and ship interaction, fin whales also face some less common threats. They may, in some rare instances, become entangled in fishing gear. Military sonar may affect the behavioral patterns of fin whales, which can lead to population decline. Similarly, whale watching may cause fin whales to alter their behavior and foraging habits.

The fin whale is covered by the Agreement on the Conservation of Cetaceans in the Black Sea, Mediterranean Sea, and Contiguous Atlantic Area (ACCOBAMS) and the Memorandum of Understanding for the Conservation of Cetaceans and Their Habitats in the Pacific Islands Region (Pacific Cetaceans MOU).

== See also ==
- Balaenoptera bertae
- List of cetaceans
