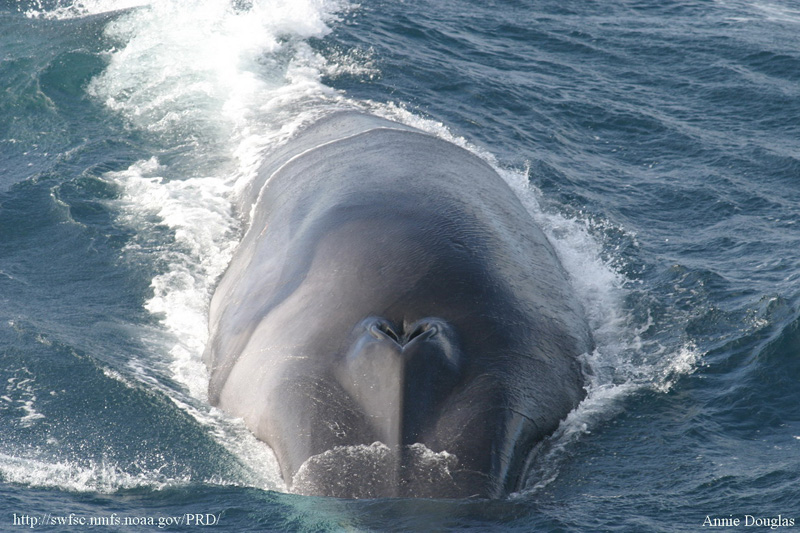

- Size compared to an average human

Scientific classification
- Kingdom: Animalia
- Phylum: Chordata
- Class: Mammalia
- Order: Artiodactyla
- Infraorder: Cetacea
- Family: Balaenopteridae
- Genus: Balaenoptera
- Species: B. physalus
- Subspecies: B. p. physalus

Trinomial name
- Balaenoptera physalus physalus (Linnaeus, 1758)

= Northern fin whale =

Subspecies of whale

The northern fin whale (Balaenoptera physalus physalus) is a subspecies of fin whale that lives in the North Atlantic Ocean and North Pacific Ocean. It has been proposed that the northern Pacific population represents a separate subspecies, B. p. velifera. At least one other subspecies of fin whale, the southern fin whale (B. p. quoyi), exists in the Southern Hemisphere.

== Size ==
Northern fin whales are smaller than their southern hemisphere counterparts, with adult males averaging 18.5 m (61 ft) and adult females 20 m (66 ft). Maximum reported figures are 22.9 m (75 ft) for males and 24.7 m (81 ft) for females in the North Pacific, while the longest reliably measured were 20.8 m (68 ft) and 22.9 m (75 ft) — all were caught off California, the former in the 1920s and the latter in the 1960s. At sexual maturity, males average 16.8–17.6 m (55–58 ft) in the North Atlantic and 17.4–17.7 m (57–58 ft) in the North Pacific, while females average 17.7–19.1 m (58–63 ft) in the North Atlantic and 18.3–18.6 m (60–61 ft) in the North Pacific. At birth, calves are 6.4 m (21 ft) in the North Pacific.

== Reproduction ==
Because of the opposing seasons in each hemisphere, B. p. physalus breeds at a different time of the year than B. p. quoyi. Peak conception for B. p. physalus is December–January, while peak birthing is in November–December in both the North Atlantic and North Pacific.
