= Louis Companyo =

French physician and naturalist

Louis Companyo (born in Céret in 1781 and died in Perpignan in 1871) was a French medical doctor and naturalist.

Louis Companyo was a founder and director of the Musée d'Histoire Naturelle de Perpignan and wrote Histoire Naturelle du département des Pyrénées-Orientales. Perpignan, 1861–1864, the first book on the natural history of the Pyrenees when over eighty years old. The 3 volumes cover geography, geology, and paleontology (Volume 1), botany (Volume 2), zoology and entomology (Volume 3).
