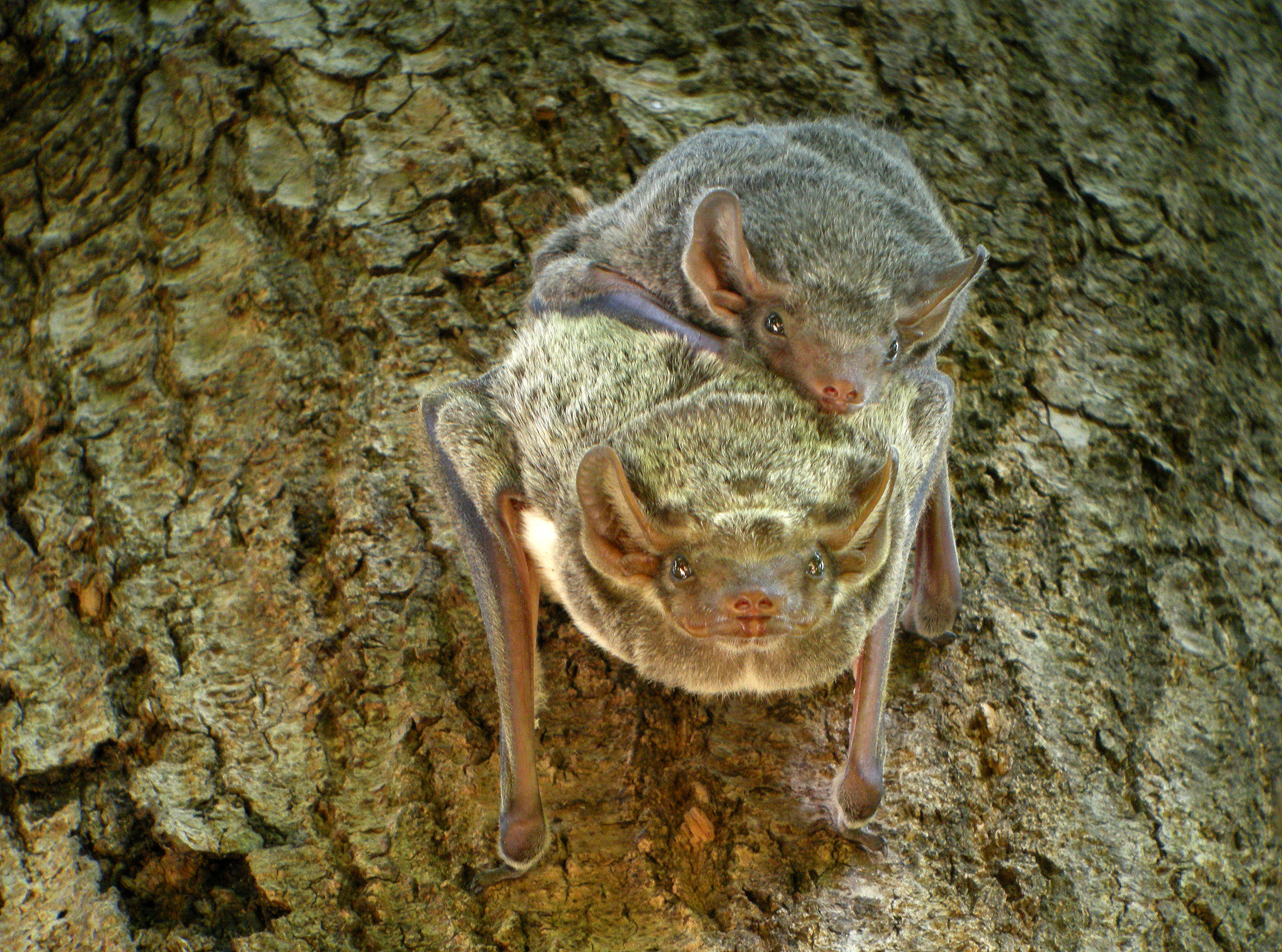

Conservation status
- Least Concern (IUCN 3.1)

Scientific classification
- Kingdom: Animalia
- Phylum: Chordata
- Class: Mammalia
- Infraclass: Placentalia
- Order: Chiroptera
- Family: Emballonuridae
- Genus: Taphozous
- Species: T. mauritianus

Binomial name
- Taphozous mauritianus Geoffroy, 1818
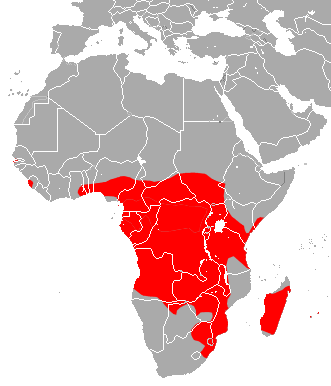
- Mauritian tomb bat range

= Mauritian tomb bat =

Species of bat

The Mauritian tomb bat (Taphozous mauritianus) is a species of sac-winged bat in the family Emballonuridae that is found in central and southern Africa and Madagascar. It was first described in 1818 by Étienne Geoffroy Saint-Hilaire, and is characterized by an all-white ventral surface, grizzled dorsal coloration, and conical face. It has exceptionally good eyesight, a trait which is common in old world bats and enables it to find roosting locations. It has adapted itself to a wide range of habitats including subarid scrub to semi-tropical savanna and can be found throughout much of Africa south of the Sahara, including many of the surrounding islands. They often seek out refuge in cool dry areas. Mauritian tomb bats help control pest populations, including insects that carry human diseases. These bats tend to be nocturnal hunters and their normal prey consists of moths, butterflies, and termites. Not prone to large-scale roosting, T. mauritianus is most often spotted on the sides of buildings or on the trunks of trees in groups of around five individuals. They breed on average once or twice a year and rear usually one pup, though twins are occasionally reported. They usually deposit their hungry offspring in areas where they can feed voraciously, most often in berry bushes. This species is listed as least concern on the IUCN Red List due their wide distribution and stable population.

== Taxonomy and etymology ==
The French naturalist Étienne Geoffroy Saint-Hilaire identified the Mauritian tomb bat in 1818 when he compared the at the time unknown specimen to another newly described bat from Egypt, the Egyptian tomb bat. The Egyptian tomb bat (T. perforatus) is the same size as its Mauritian cousin but does not have the completely white belly that the latter possess.

The name "tomb" bat and the genus name Taphozous is derived from the Greek word for a tomb or grave. Mauritianus simply means "of Mauritius," where it was first discovered. Though the name would suggest a dark, closed-in habitat, the Mauritian tomb bat lives in a variety of environments and is not restricted to tombs or caves. The term "tomb bat" was given because the genus is commonly seen on the walls of old tombs in their respective ranges.

Synonyms for the Mauritian tomb bat include Taphozous mauritianus, T. leucopterus, T. dobsoni, and T. maritianus var. vinerascens. The Afrikaans word for this species is witlyfvlermuis, which refers to the white ventral surface that is characteristic of the species.

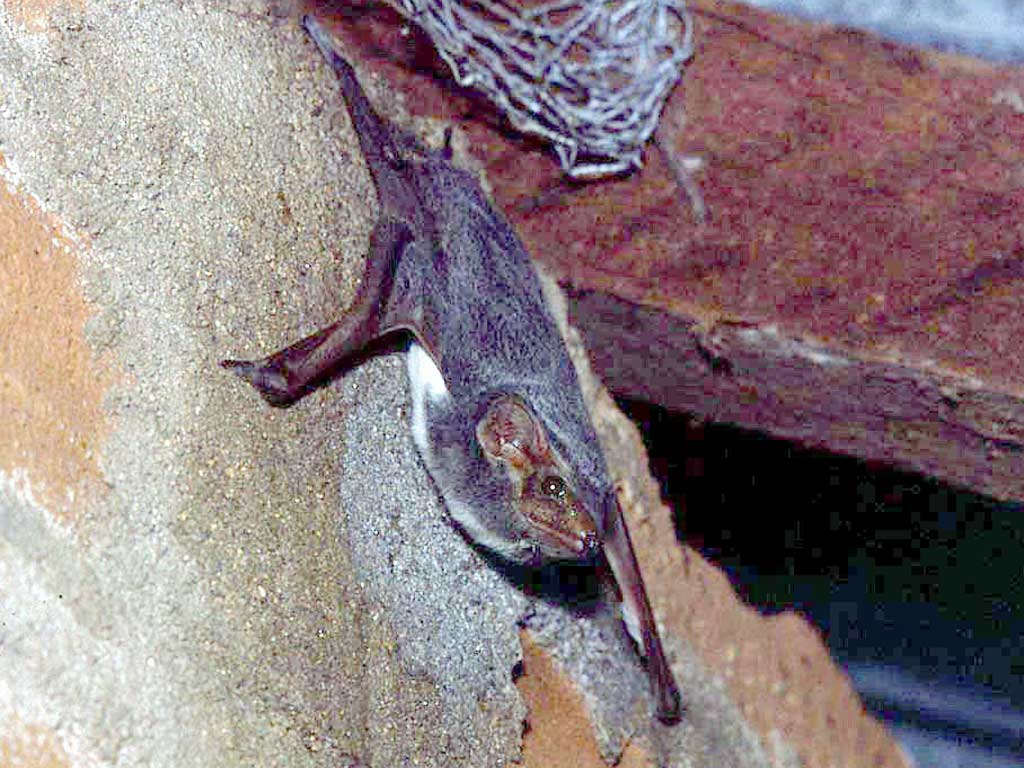
a Mauritian tomb bat (Taphozous mauritianus) on a building by Lake Manyara, Serengeti

== Description ==
The Mauritian tomb bat is distinguished from other species of bat by a completely white ventral area. The dorsal surface of T. mauritianus is a mottled color consisting of several shades of brown, gray, and white, which creates a grizzled "salt and pepper" appearance. Its fur is sleek and short, and the wing membranes are beige and primarily translucent. The wings are long, narrow, and shorten when not in flight in a way that facilitates crawling, a trait unique to this genus. Sexes are similar in color and size. Adults are generally lighter in color than juveniles, who have more of a gray hue. This species has a conically shaped face, which is covered in a thin layer of hair. The area below and in front of the eyes is bare, and the frontal portion of the face is sunken around the eyes. The eyes are large (2–3 mm). The ears are triangular-shaped, erect, and have rounded edges. The inner margins of the ear lack papillae, which is the inner sensory surface of the bat's ear. One of the larger species in the Microchiroptera suborder, fully grown adults weigh anywhere from 25 to 36 grams (0.88 to 1.27 oz), with its forearm measuring 58 to 64 millimetres (2.3 to 2.5 in). The total length is from 10 to 11 centimetres (3.9 to 4.3 in).

=== Sexual dimorphism ===
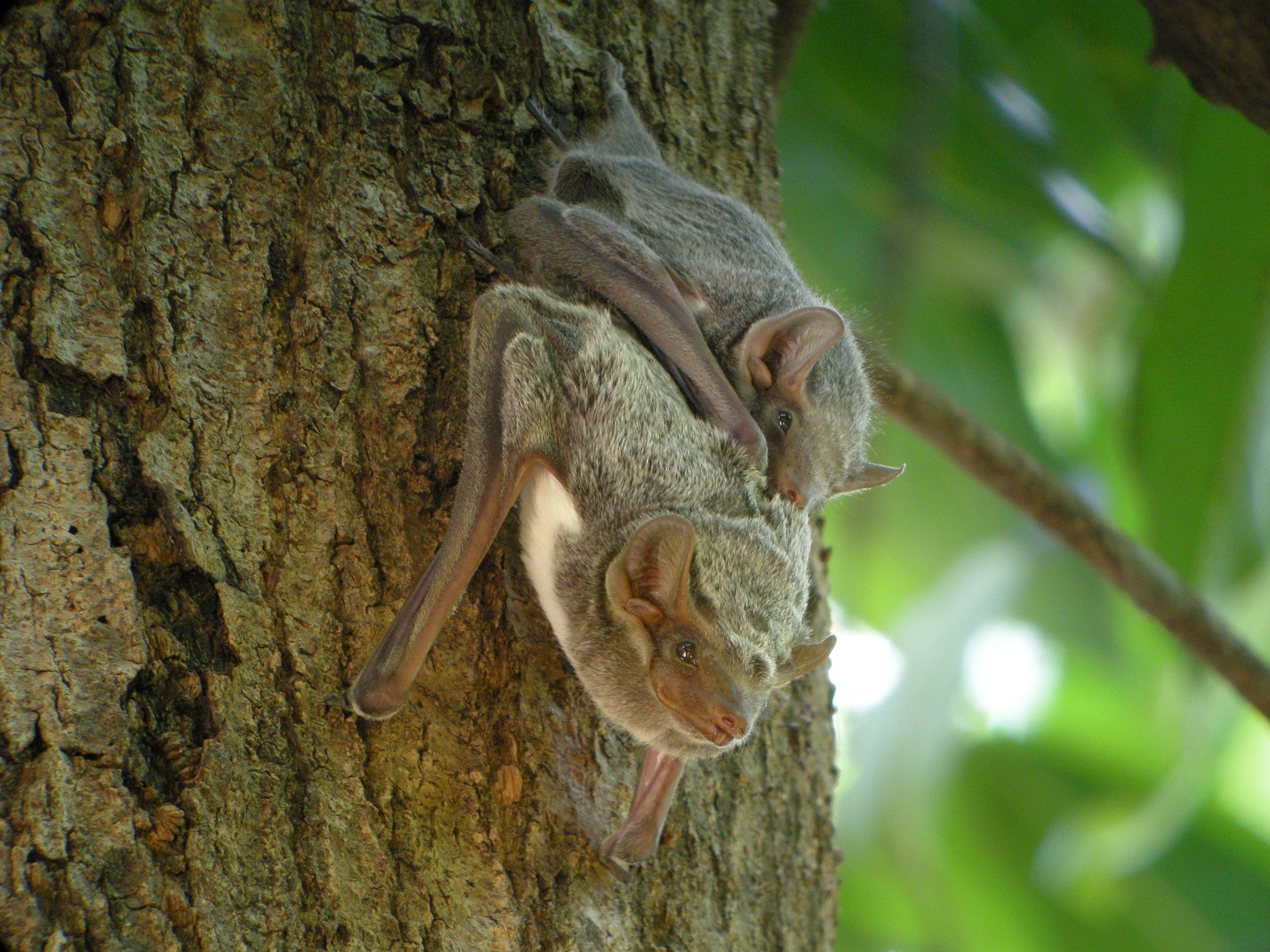
A mother Mauritian tomb bat and her pup in Ankarafantsika, Madagascar

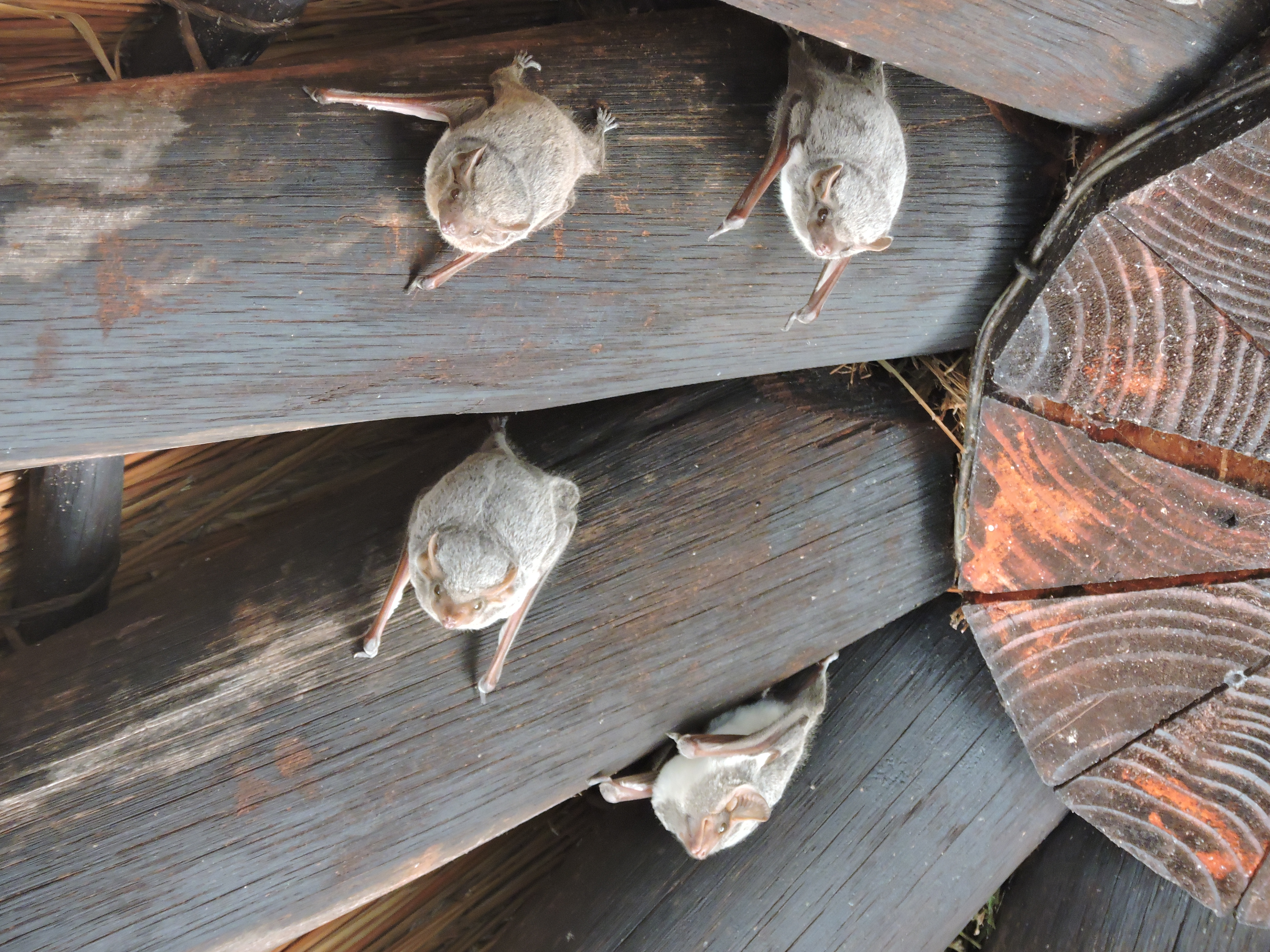
The grizzled colour form of the Mauritian tomb bat in the Kruger National Park. The white belly is diagnostic

T. mauritianus does not display an abundance of visual sexual dimorphism concerning their size or coloration. Outside of the breeding season, the male reproductive organs are held in the abdominal cavity. During the breeding season, the genitals appear and become darker in color. The males possess a gular sac that lies at the base of the jaw. This gland releases secretions that help males mark their territories and attract females during the mating season. The gular sac is present in some females, depending on which region Africa the bat is found. In areas such as Nigeria and Mozambique, the sac is absent in females, in West Africa it is reduced to a vestigial pouch, and in the Sudan it is fully present in both sexes, just more developed in males. In females, the genitals are located on the ventral side of the abdomen and are marked by two pigmented patches. During the mating season, they become deeply pigmented and extend out, becoming more prominent before and just after mating.

== Distribution and habitat ==
The Mauritian tomb bat is widely distributed from the middle to the southern regions of Africa, as well as on many of the surrounding islands. They are found in Angola, Benin, Botswana, Central African Republic, Chad, Republic of the Congo, Democratic Republic of the Congo, Ivory Coast, Equatorial Guinea, Ethiopia, Gabon, Gambia, Ghana, Kenya, Madagascar, Malawi, Mauritius, Mozambique, Namibia, Nigeria, Réunion, São Tomé and Príncipe, Senegal, Seychelles, Sierra Leone, Somalia, South Africa, Sudan, Swaziland, Tanzania, Togo, Uganda, Zambia, and Zimbabwe.

Special kidney adaptations that aid in water conservation allow the Mauritian tomb bat to survive in the often dry, semi-arid regions of countries such as the Sudan and Chad. The bat's kidneys have a mean renal index of 5.55. This means that the bat's inner medulla, the part of the kidney that collects waste, is very large compared to the overall size of the organ, so that the animal can remove much of the waste out the water it drinks. The bats have a predicted mean maximum urine concentration of 3,921 mosmol/kg, which means the urine they produce is very concentrated. From this, scientists have tentatively come to the conclusion that this species' kidneys offer valuable water conservation.

Mauritian tomb bats are occasionally found in grassland biomes as well as in semi-arid and tropical regions. They can be found in forests, rain forests, and grasslands. These bats can be found in the Sahara, which receives less than 500 mm of rainfall per year. The bats prefer open, moist savanna with plenty of maneuvering room with close proximity roosting sights. Often this species can be found near open swamps and rivers, where there is a steady food supply. They may need the open water for hunting. T. mauritianus avoids the thicker parts of tropical forests due to its somewhat limited turning maneuverability. In some countries, such as Sao Tomé and Principe, groups of this species find homes in the cocoa trees of the large plantations, which offer an excellent environment with roosts, adequately spaced trees, and many insects to feed upon.

The tomb bat prefers sites where there is overhead shelter, but are situated in exposed positions for easier take off. T. mauritianus's natural roosting locations include the trunks of palm trees, caves, and crevices. With the arrival of humans, they have adapted to a variety of new locations such as the sides of buildings and, as their name implies, tombs. They prefer buildings with bare brick surfaces as opposed to painted ones, as it offers better grip. They choose their day roosts so that take-off is unhindered by obstacles inhibiting flight.

== Behavior and ecology ==
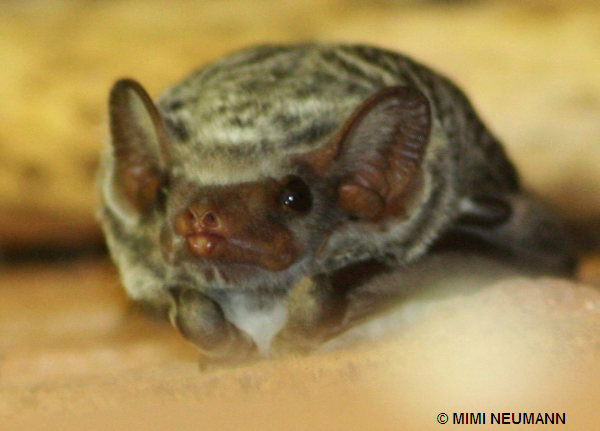
Mauritian tomb bat at Johannesburg, South Africa

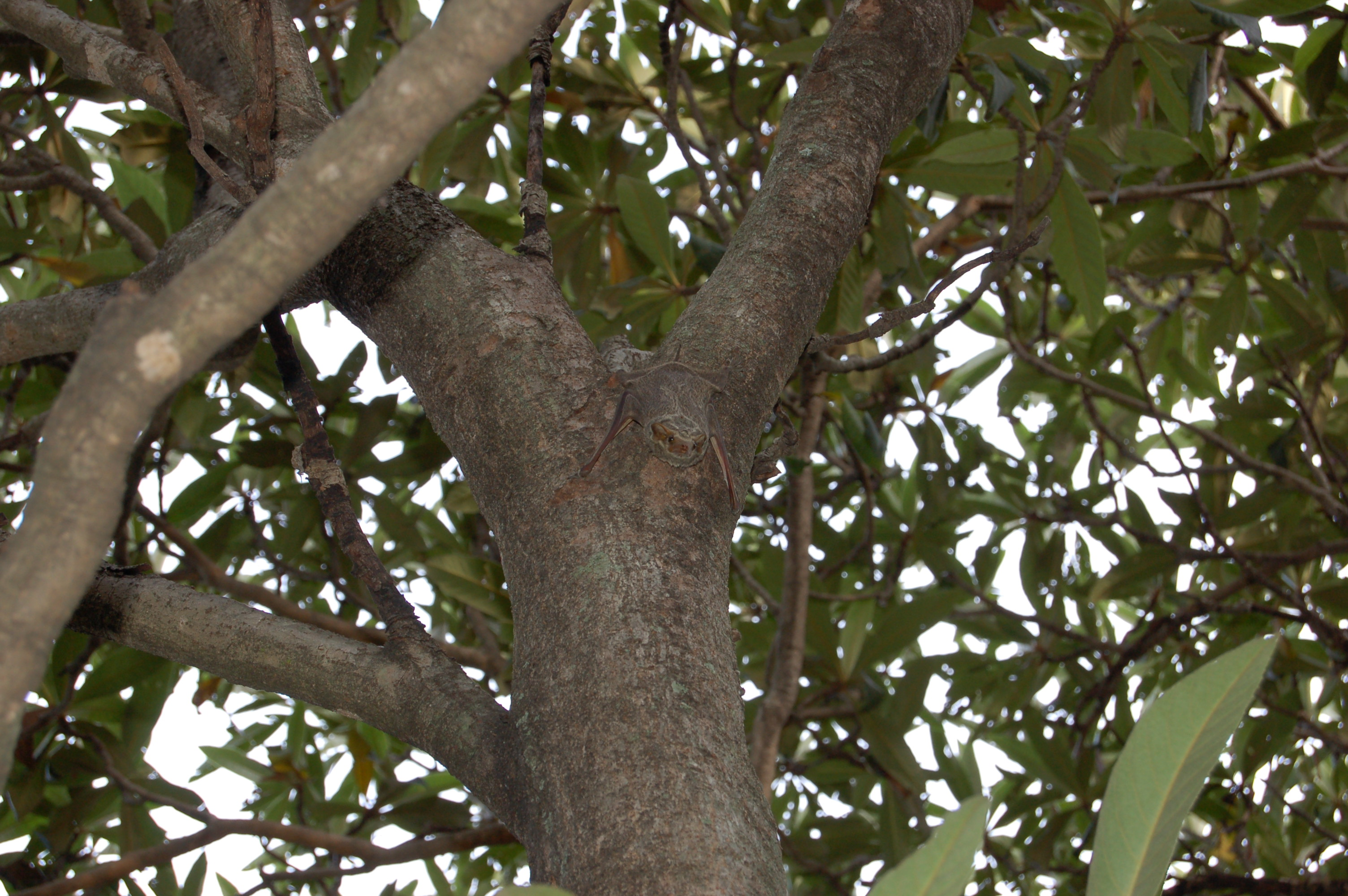
Mauritian tomb bat at Nkomazi Wilderness Nature Reserve, South Africa

The Mauritian tomb bat is often found in groups of around five individuals. These groups are usually either made up of entirely male or female individuals; when they are found in mixed-gender groups, the two sexes are separated by at least 10 centimetres (3.9 in). Females live together in groups of three to thirty, while males live alone except during the mating season. Unlike some species of bats, they do not roost close together in tight packs; instead they are found spaced out loosely, with the exception of a mother and her offspring. There are places where groups of at least a hundred bats have been found, one example being the Shai Hills Resource Reserve in Ghana.

They usually roost with their ventral side flat against a surface. The Mauritian tomb bat is nocturnal and rests during the day; however, it does not sleep much and remains watchful while roosting. If disturbed, they will fly off to another site or move quickly up under the eaves of the building. Very rarely do they travel far from their day roosting site, and roosts are often recolonized. Over time these sites become stained with gular sack secretions and urine. The stains are typically a rectangular brown shape roughly 150 mm long and 100 mm wide.

The semi-diurnal activity of tomb bats has led to the evolution of relatively good eyesight, unlike most echolocating bats. Their vision is very similar to the eyesight found in that of Old-World bats. The presence of the dim-light (RH1) gene in both the tomb bats and Old-World bats suggests convergent evolution of this gene in a similar light-rich environment. The Mauritian tomb bat can detect movement from a distance away, which suggests that the bat's eyesight is superior to that of other insect-eating bats. This advanced eyesight plays a large role in finding a suitable roost for the day and detecting predators. The Mauritian tomb bat is, for the most part, a nocturnal hunter, though it does occasionally forage during the day. They prefer to hunt in open spaces such as over an open field or body of water, so they can easily swoop down and grab the insects they feed on. The Mauritian tomb bat captures its prey and consumes it while in flight.

Their preferred food is moths, though during daylight hours they will prey upon butterflies and termites. In regions where the bats live, they often are a factor in keeping pest populations down. This is important since the bats inhabit areas often plagued by insect-borne diseases such as malaria. They usually wait for complete darkness before foraging. Over open areas, they can detect their prey at long ranges. They periodically make dives when hunting, and with each dive, they increase the rate of echolocation.

=== Echolocation ===
The bats use audible calls to communicate with each other. When at rest, they chirrup; when faced with an aggressive situation, they screech. They use social communication, touch, and chemical cues. In its home continent of Africa, it is well known for the squeaks, chirrups, and other noises that it makes that are barely audible to humans.

When it is dark, they use echolocation calls to forage. During daylight hours, they can rely on vision to look for prey and intruders. The echolocation in T. mauritianus is unique in that their frequency pulses are emitted in patterns of twos and threes separated by long intervals of silence. This helps observers distinguish the species from other kinds of bats. The bats can adjust the frequency they emit to fit a given situation. For example, the bat can decrease the frequency to less than 20 Hertz to hunt insects that are attuned to bat echolocation, which gives them an advantage and increases their number of potential food sources. They are capable of emitting frequencies more than 25 Hertz, which allows them to hunt in less open habitats. This increases their range of habitats, and allows them to be flexible in their choice of environments.

=== Mating and reproduction ===
Mauritian tomb bats are polygamous. Depending on the region, they mate either once or twice per year. Tomb bats of the Southern African subregion often produce two pups: one in February or March and another in October through December. Others mate in December with a gestation period of four to five months, and give birth in April or May. Mothers give birth to a single pup in a litter. Mothers take care of the young after birth; the males take no part in raising it. The pup clings to its mother's abdomen during flight and when perched. The young will remain with the mother, clinging to her chest wherever she goes, until it is able to fly. The mother nurses the young during this time. The young drink their mother's milk until they are weaned onto their adult diet of insects. The time spent with the mother allows the young to observe hunting behavior as well as learn other skills necessary for survival as an adult. Once the young bat is able to fly, it can forage for itself. It may stay with the mother's colony or find another when it is grown.

== Conservation ==
The Mauritian tomb bat is of "Least Concern (LC)" on the IUCN Red List. Although its population and the population trend are unknown, the bat is easily found throughout its range. Mauritian tomb bats are widespread throughout Africa and neighboring islands. They are not listed as requiring special conservation action under any current programs.

== Cited texts ==
- Dengis, Carol A. (May 17, 1996). "Taphozous mauritianus" (PDF). Mammalian Species (522). American Society of Mammalogists: 1–5. doi:10.2307/3504189. JSTOR 3504189.
- Du Toit, Stephan (July 2006). "Photographic record of a Mauritian Tomb Bat, Taphozous mauritianus E. Geoffroy Saint-Hilaire, 1818 (Emballonuridae) from Mogale City (Gauteng, South Africa))" (PDF). African Bat Conservation News. 9: 3–4. Archived from the original (PDF) on 25 May 2010.
- Fenton, M. B.; Bell, G. P.; Thomas, D. W. (2008). "Echolocation and feeding behavior of Taphozous mauritianus (Chiroptera: Emballonuridae)". Canadian Journal of Zoology. 58 (10): 1774–1777. doi:10.1139/z80-244.
- Garbutt, Nick (2007). "Mauritian Tomb Bat". Mammals of Madagascar: A Complete Guide. Yale University Press. p. 67. ISBN 978-0-300-12550-4.
- Goodman, Steven M.; Benstead, Jonathan P.; Schütz, Harald (2007). The Natural History of Madagascar. University of Chicago Geography Research Paper Series. University of Chicago Press. pp. 1292–1293. ISBN 978-0-226-30307-9.
- Monadjem, A.; Fahr, J.; Mickleburgh, S.; Racey, P.A.; Hutson, A.M.; Ravino, J.; Bergmans, W. (2017). "Taphozous mauritianus". IUCN Red List of Threatened Species. 2017 e.T21460A22111004. doi:10.2305/IUCN.UK.2017-2.RLTS.T21460A22111004.en.
- Panckoucke, Charles Louis Fleury (1828). Description de l'Égypte, ou Recueil des observations et des recherches qui ont été faites en Égypte pendant l'expédition de l'armée française: Histoire naturelle. pp. 148–149.
- Shen, Y-Y; Liu, J; Irwin, DM; Zhang, Y-P (2010). "Parallel and Convergent Evolution of the Dim-Light Vision Gene RH1 in Bats (Order: Chiroptera)". PLOS ONE. 5 (1) e8838. Bibcode:2010PLoSO...5.8838S. doi:10.1371/journal.pone.0008838. PMC 2809114. PMID 20098620.
- Skinner, John D.; Chimimba, Christian T. (2005). The Mammals of the Southern African Subregion. South Africa: Cambridge University Press. pp. 274–275. ISBN 978-0-521-84418-5.
- Stuart, Chris (2001) [1988]. Field Guide to Mammals of South Africa. Cape Town, South Africa: Struik Publishers. p. 50. ISBN 1-86872-537-5.
- Taylor, P.J. (July 1999). "Echolocation calls of twenty southern African bat species". South African Journal of Zoology. 34 (3). Durban Natural Science Museum and Durban Bat Interest Group: 114–125. doi:10.1080/02541858.1999.11448496.
- "Mauritian Tomb Bat", Encyclopedia of Life, 2010
- "Mauritian Tomb Bat". The Cardboard Box Travel Shop. Archived from the original on 2011-05-20.
- "Batscans: Taphozous mauritianus". American Museum of Natural History.
