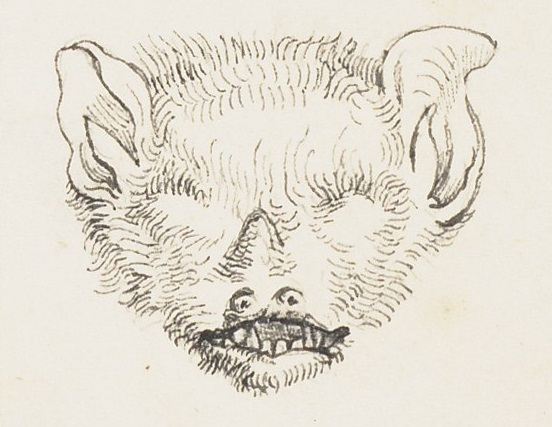

Conservation status
- Data Deficient (IUCN 3.1)

Scientific classification
- Kingdom: Animalia
- Phylum: Chordata
- Class: Mammalia
- Order: Chiroptera
- Family: Vespertilionidae
- Genus: Scotophilus
- Species: S. borbonicus

Binomial name
- Scotophilus borbonicus É. Geoffroy, 1803
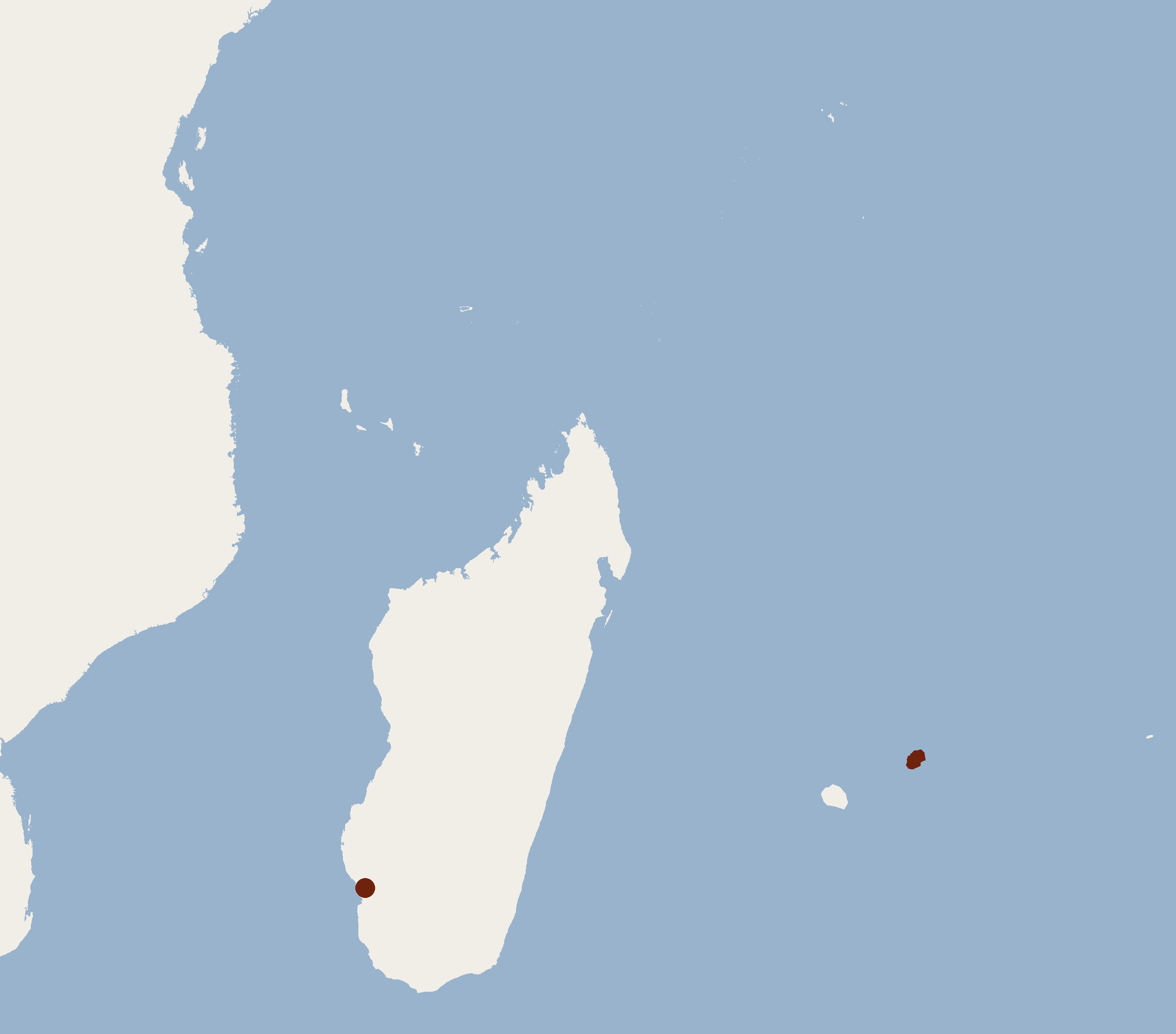

= Lesser yellow bat =

Species of bat

The lesser yellow bat (Scotophilus borbonicus) is a vesper bat found only on Madagascar and Réunion. On Réunion, it was considered common early in the 19th century, but was last sighted late in the 19th century. Only a single specimen attributed to this species, collected in 1868, is known from Madagascar. It was listed as a critically endangered species in 1996 due to habitat loss, and may be extinct.
