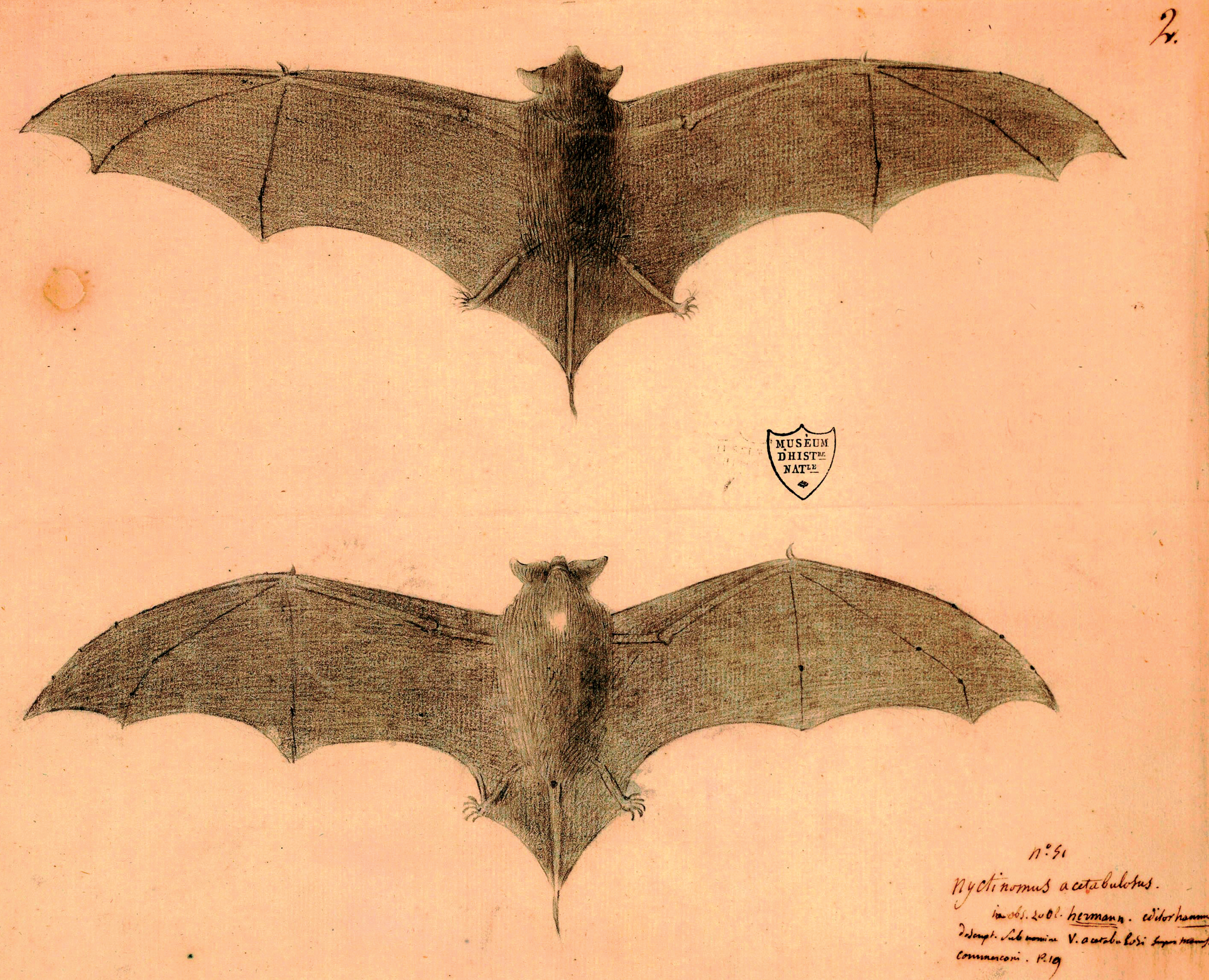
- Type illustration by Paul Jossigny from 1770

Conservation status
- Endangered (IUCN 3.1)

Scientific classification
- Kingdom: Animalia
- Phylum: Chordata
- Class: Mammalia
- Order: Chiroptera
- Family: Molossidae
- Genus: Mormopterus
- Subgenus: Mormopterus
- Species: M. acetabulosus

Binomial name
- Mormopterus acetabulosus Hermann, 1804

Synonyms
- Vespertilio acetabulosus Hermann, 1804

= Natal free-tailed bat =

Species of bat

The Natal free-tailed bat (Mormopterus acetabulosus) is a species of bat in the family Molossidae, the free-tailed bats. It is endemic to the island of Mauritius. It is known from fewer than five locations in its range, but it is common at a few sites. It roosts in caves, and it is considered to be an endangered species due to disturbance of its cave habitat.

== Taxonomy and etymology ==
It was described as a new species in 1804 by French naturalist Johann Hermann. Hermann placed it in the genus Vespertilio. In 2008, the Natal free-tailed bat was split into two taxa with the description of a new species, Mormopterus francoismoutoui. The species is called the "Natal" free-tailed bat because of another species Hermann described, Dysopes natalensis, named after the Natal Province of South Africa.

Dysopes natalensis was later synonymized with the Natal free-tailed bat. Its species name "acetabulosus" is Latin for saucer-shaped.

== Description ==
The Natal free-tailed bat is a very small species of bat. Its upper lip is very wrinkled. Its ears are small and connected in the back by a thin interaural membrane. Males have a sebaceous gland, as with some other free-tailed bats, but they do not have an interaural crest. Its dental formula is 1.1.1.33.1.2.3 for a total of 30 teeth.

== Range and habitat ==
It is endemic to Mauritius. There is one "doubtful" record from Madagascar and two records from South Africa which may be vagrants.

== Conservation ==
As of 2017, it is listed as endangered by the IUCN. From 1999–2017, its population likely declined by more than 80%. Its caves are being disturbed for tourism.
