= Southern fin whale =

- Size compared to an average human

Scientific classification
- Kingdom: Animalia
- Phylum: Chordata
- Class: Mammalia
- Order: Artiodactyla
- Infraorder: Cetacea
- Family: Balaenopteridae
- Genus: Balaenoptera
- Species: B. physalus
- Subspecies: B. p. quoyi

Trinomial name
- Balaenoptera physalus quoyi (Fischer, 1829)

Subspecies of whale

The southern fin whale (Balaenoptera physalus quoyi) is a subspecies of fin whale that lives in the Southern Ocean. At least one other subspecies of fin whale, the northern fin whale (B. p. physalus), exists in the Northern Hemisphere.

== Taxonomy ==
Based on differences in the vertebrae, the Swedish zoologist Einar Lönnberg (1931) designated Balaenoptera physalus quoyii (later the Russian scientist A.G. Tomilin (1957) corrected this to B. p. quoyi). B. p. quoyi in turn is based on Balaena quoyi (Fischer, 1829), which was the name given to a 16.7 m (55 ft) specimen seen on the shores of the Falkland Islands by Monsieur Quoy and originally named Balaena rostrata australis by Desmoulins (1822).

== Size ==
Southern fin whales are larger than their northern hemisphere counterparts, with males averaging 20.5 m (67 ft) and females 22 m (72 ft). Maximum reported figures are 25 m (82 ft) for males and 27.3 m (90 ft) for females, while the longest measured by Mackintosh and Wheeler (1929) were 22.4 metres (73 feet 6 inches) and 24.5 metres (80 feet 5 inches); although Major F. A. Spencer, while whaling inspector of the factory ship Southern Princess (1936–38), confirmed the length of a 25.9 m (85 ft) female caught in the Antarctic south of the southern Indian Ocean. At sexual maturity, males average 19.2 m (63 ft) and females 19.9 m (65 ft).

== Reproduction ==
Because of the opposing seasons in each hemisphere, B. p. quoyi breeds at a different time of the year than B. p. physalus. Peak conception for B. p. quoyi is June–July, while peak birthing is in May. Along with the impacts of whaling, slower reproduction rate of the species may affect population recoveries as the total population size is predicted to be at less than 50% of its pre-whaling state by 2100.
