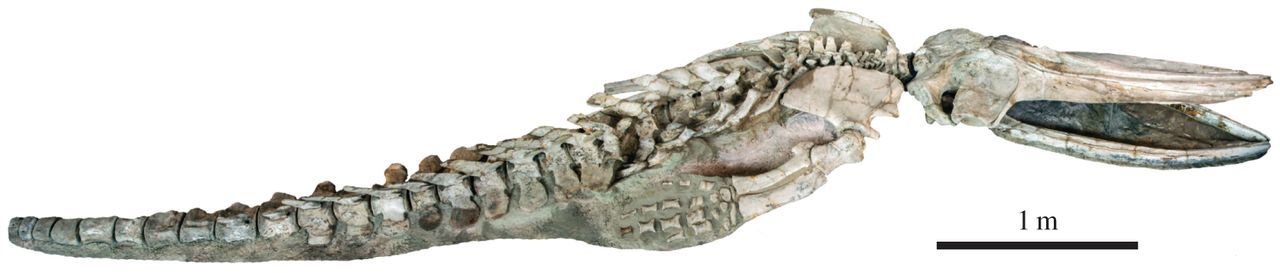
- Holotype specimen

Scientific classification
- Kingdom: Animalia
- Phylum: Chordata
- Class: Mammalia
- Order: Artiodactyla
- Infraorder: Cetacea
- Superfamily: Balaenopteroidea
- Family: Balaenopteridae
- Genus: †Incakujira; Marx & Kohno, 2016

Species
- †I. anillodefuego (type) Marx & Kohno, 2016; †I. fordycei Kimura & Hasegawa, 2024

= Incakujira =

Incakujira Temporal range: Miocene (Tortonian-Messinian), ~8–7.3 Ma

Extinct genus of rorqual whales

Incakujira (meaning Inca whale) is a genus of rorqual whales that lived during the Late Miocene epoch in what are now the coasts of Peru, about 8 million to 7.3 million years ago. It contains two species, Incakujira anillodefuego and Incakujira fordycei, both from the Aguada de Lomas locality of the Pisco Formation. The type species, I. anillodefuego, was named and described in 2016 while the second species was described in 2024. All currently known specimens are immature, representing old calves to subadults, though already of significant size. The largest specimen of I. anillodefuego measures a total of 8.25 m (27.1 ft) while the holotype of I. fordycei, which is skeletally younger, has been estimated to have reached a total length of up to 10.47 m (34.4 ft), suggesting that the species may have been larger on average.

While phylogenetic analysis suggest that Incakujira was closely related to modern rorquals, it may have differed somewhat in its preferred hunting method. The proportions of the vertebrae suggest that it was better adapted for maneuverability rather than stability while swimming, which today generally corresponds to a broader diet of both non-evasive prey (like copepods) and evasive prey such as schooling fish. Aspects of the cranial anatomy on the other hand could indicate that it was less adapt at lunge feeding as its modern relatives, with the craniomandibular articulation restricting the rotation of the mandible and therefore likely limiting the amount of water and therefore prey the animal could take in with a single gulp. Instead Incakujira may have employed a skim feeding strategy convergent with sei and right whales.

== History and naming ==
Incakujira is known from three almost completely preserved specimens belonging to two species, all found in the Pisco Formation of Peru. The first Incakujira skeleton to be found was GMNH-PV-159, a nearly complete skeleton which was recovered from the Aguada de Lomas locality by the Black Hills Institute of Geological Research in 1987. Shortly afterwards, between 1989 and 1990, Siber and Siber likewise collected fossils at Aguada de Lomas, resulting in the discovery of a further two fossil whale specimens, both similarly complete as the specimen discovered in 1987. In both instances the material was recovered with permission by the Peruvian government and ended up being sold to institutions in Japan. The Black Hills Institute remains were passed onto the Gunma Prefectural Museum of History before moving to the Gunma Museum of Natural History, while the specimens prepared by Siber and Siber were brought to the Gamagori Natural History Museum and the Kanagawa Prefectural Museum of Natural History. Though discovered a year later, the two Siber and Siber specimens would come to be described first, with Felix G. Marx and Naoki Kohno recognizing them as representing a single species they named Incakujira anillodefuego in 2016. Eight years later the specimen at the Gunma Museum of Natural History was recognized as representing a second species of the genus, named Incakujira fordycei.

The name Incakujira represents a combination of the taxon's country of origin and the current whereabouts of the fossil material, as the first part of the name is derived from the Inca Empire and the Japanese kujira (鯨(クジラ), "whale"). Similarly, the name of the type species, I. anillodefuego, references the Pacific Rim of Fire as it geographically connects Peru and Japan. The second species on the other hand, I. fordycei, takes its name from paleontologist Robert Ewan Fordyce, both for his general contribution to the study of fossil whales as well as his specific input on the specimen.

== Description ==
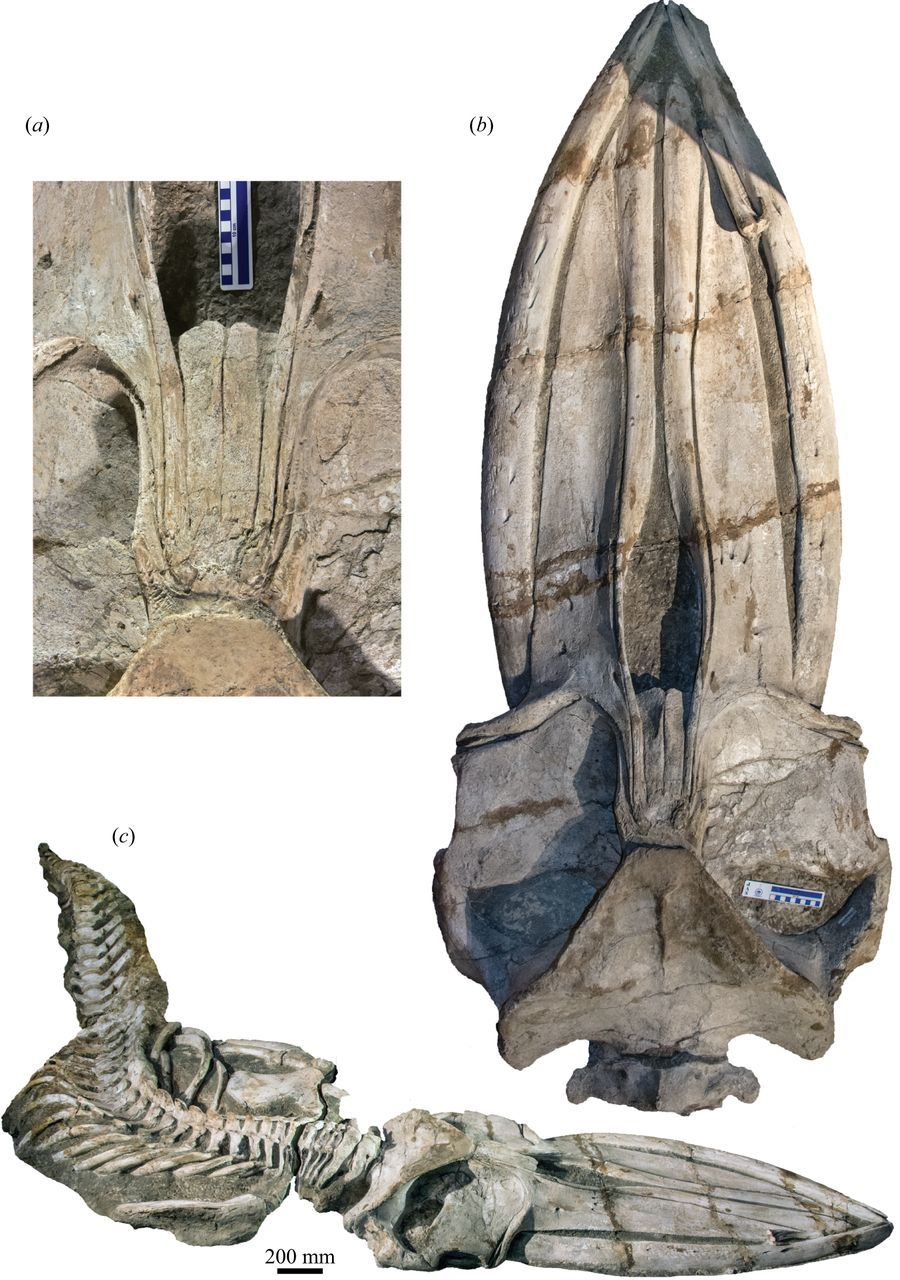
Paratype specimen

Incakujira differs from other rorquals (fossil and extant) in having a less attenuated rostrum and the features of the maxilla, supraorbital, and remainder of the cranium.

All currently known specimens of Incakujira are interpreted to represent immature individuals. The holotype of Incakujira fordycei is clearly not a young calf, but may represent an old calf or even a young subadult. The holotype specimen of I. anillodefuego similarly was interpreted as a subadult, albeit an older individual than the holotype of I. fordycei. Despite this, the latter is slightly larger, reaching a skull length of 2.377 m (7 ft 9.6 in) while the type of I. anillodefuego measures only 2.260 m (7 ft 5.0 in). This may suggest that individuals of Incakujira fordycei were on average larger than those of Incakujira anillodefuego. The preserved skeleton of Incakujira fordycei, which misses a few tail vertebrae reaches a length of 9.22 m (30.2 ft) and Kimura and Hasegawa estimated a total length of 10.47 m (34.4 ft). The two known specimens of Incakujira anillodefuego meanwhile measure 7.15 m (23.5 ft) and 8.25 m (27.1 ft) respectively.

== Phylogeny ==
Incakujira is a member of the family Balaenopteridae, the rorquals, which includes animals like the humpback whale and the blue whale. However the precise placement of the genus is somewhat unclear as morphological, molecular and total evidence analysis often yield contradictory results as to the internal composition of the family, sometimes resulting in the inclusion of gray whales. In their morphology-only analysis Marx and Kohno recover Incakujira as the sister taxon to a monophyletic Balaenoptera to the exclusion of gray and humpback whales, while the total-analysis places it as the sister taxon of the modern humpback whale (Megaptera novaeangliae). The authors do however note that the placement alongside Megaptera is poorly supported while the morphology-only analysis may be influenced by characters that are merely convergently evolved between forms.

Following the description of the second species another phylogenetic analysis was conducted, confirming Incakujira anillodefuego and Incakujira fordycei as each others closest relatives. The analysis places them at the base of the balaenopterid crown-group, basal to Archaebalaenoptera and Balaenoptera but more derived than Megaptera.

- - Balaenidae
  - - †Cetotheriidae
    - Balaenopteroidea
      - stem-balaenopteroids
      - - †"Balaenoptera" ryani
        - - †"Megaptera" miocaena
          - - - †Balaenoptera bertae
              - - Balaenoptera acutorostrata (northern minke whale)
                - Balaenoptera bonaerensis (southern minke whale)
            - - - †Archaebalaenoptera
                - †Parabalaenoptera
              - - - †Balaenoptera siberi
                  - - Balaenoptera musculus (blue whale)
                    - - Balaenoptera omurai (Omurai's whale)
                      - Balaenoptera borealis (sei whale)
                - - - NMNZ MM001630
                    - - Balaenoptera physalus (fin whale)
                      - - Megaptera novaeangliae (humpback whale)
                        - †Incakujira anillodefuego
                  - - - †Diunatans
                      - - †Plesiobalaenoptera
                        - †"Megaptera" hubachi
                    - - †"Balaenoptera" portisi
                      - - Eschrichtius robustus (gray whale)
                        - - †Eschrichtioides
                          - †Gricetoides

- - †Parabalaenoptera
  - †Norrisanima
  - †"Balaenoptera" ryani
  - †"Balaenoptera" bertae
  - - †"Balaenoptera" portisi
    - - †Gricetoides
      - - Eschrichtius robustus (gray whale)
        - †Eschrichtioides
  - - †Miobalaenoptera numataensis YPM
    - †Miobalaenoptera numataensis NFL
    - †Plesiobalaenoptera
    - NMNZ MM001630
    - †"Megaptera" hubachi
    - †Diunatans
    - - Megaptera novaeangliae (humpback whale)
      - - - †Incakujira anillodefuego
          - †Incakujira fordycei
        - - †Archaebalaenoptera
          - - †Balaenoptera siberi
            - - Balaenoptera omurai (Omurai's whale)
              - - - Balaenoptera acutorostrata (northern minke whale)
                  - Balaenoptera bonaerensis (southern minke whale)
                - - Balaenoptera borealis (sei whale)
                  - - Balaenoptera musculus (blue whale)
                    - Balaenoptera physalus (fin whale)

== Paleobiology ==
While certain aspects of the paleobiology of Incakujira remain difficult to determine due to the absence of preserved soft tissue structures, some behaviors have been inferred based on the skeletal anatomy and comparison with modern taxa. Following a 2001 study by Emily A. Buchholtz and a 2008 paper by Kimura and Hasegawa, the swimming style of whales can be gauged from the proportions of the vertebral centra. According to these studies, whales with vertebral centra that are shorter than wide and tall profit from improved stability, while those with centra longer than wide or tall are capable of a greater dorsoventral (up and down) movement of the fluke and peduncles, which in turn allows the animal to be more maneuverable. Between these, dubbed stability priority mode swimming and maneuverability priority mode swimming, the vertebrae of Incakujira fordycei clearly fit the latter, suggesting that much like modern minke, sei and Bryde's whales the animal was adapted towards maneuverability rather than stability when swimming.

The specific swimming mode appears to also correlate with prey preference in modern forms. Stability priority mode swimmers like blue and fin whales as well as the more distantly related right whales of the family Balaenidae seem to favor non-evasive prey such as krill and copepods whereas maneuverability priority mode swimmers feed on a wider range of prey items. Bryde's whales primarily go after schooling fish, minke whales feed on both evasive and non-evasive prey and sei whales with their finely-structured baleen will not only prey on schooling fish but also skim feed on copepods. Incakujira fordycei may therefore have had a similarly broad range of prey, feeding on non-evasive zooplankton as well as fish. Further supporting this conclusion is the fact that the baleen of Incakujira fordycei are similarly densely arranged as in minke and Brdye's whales.

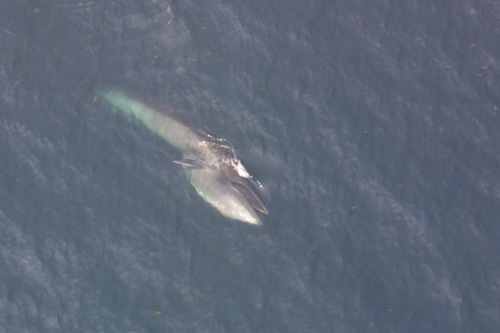
Incakujira may have been more limited in its ability to lunge feed than other modern rorquals, perhaps employing skim feeding like sei whales to prey on copepods and fish.

Marx and Kohno also speculated on the feeding ecology of Incakujira, but base their research in the cranial anatomy of the animal. They prefice their research by highlighting that important anatomical traits associated with the lunge feeding strategy employed by modern rorquals are not currently determinable in Incakujira, as many of these features are present in the soft tissue and leave no apparent marks on the underlying bone. More specifically, modern rorquals make use of an expandable throat sack, a fibrous craniomandibular joint and sensory organs on the mandible that sense both jaw motion and throat sack inflation, the presence of which cannot be verified in Incakujira. They do however find that the broad, upruptly depressed supraorbital of the process with its thickened and rounded postorbital ridge is exclusive to balaenopterids to the exclusion of the skim or suction feeding eomysticetids and cetotheriids. This structure may serve as a pulley for a well-developed temporalis muscle and could therefore provide at least some evidence for Incakujira being capable of lunge feeding.

On the other hand, the twisted postglenoid process of the squamosal suggests that the lunge-feeding capabilities of Incakujira were not as great as those of extant rorquals. In modern forms the craniomandibular joint is fibrous, allowing the lower jaw to be rotate longitudinally, dorsoventrally and laterally, providing them with the ability to open their mouths widely and take in a greater amount of prey. While in modern rorquals the transverely oriented postglenoid process poses no obstacle to lateral rotation, the twisted process of Incakujira anillodefuego may have hindered if not fully prevented this. The actual effects of this are unclear, but would have likely limited the amount of water the animal would have been able to take in with a single gulp. Marx and Kohno draw parallels between Incakujira anillodefuego and modern sei whales, which have a distinct rostral morphology, densely packed baleen plates and a relatively more restricted throat sacks than other rorquals and instead appear to have developed a skim feeding technique similar to right whales. Accordingly, they propose that Incakujira anillodefuego may have likewise employed skim feeding to prey on small prey like copepods.

=== Paleoenvironment ===
Both species of Incakujira have been recovered from the Aguada de Lomas locality of the Pisco Formation, the vertebrae bearing levels of said locality having been roughly confined to an interval of 8-7 or 7.5-7.3 Mya. The holotype of Incakujira fordycei was preserved alongside the teeth of the shark Cosmopolitodus hastalis.
