= San Diego Formation =

Geological formation

- Stratigraphic range: Pliocene
- Type: Geologic formation

Lithology
- Primary: Conglomerate
- Other: Sandstone

Location
- Region: San Diego County, California, Baja California
- Country: United States, Mexico

Type section
- Named for: San Diego, California

The San Diego Formation is a geological formation in southwestern San Diego County, California, United States, and northwestern Baja California, Mexico.

== Geology ==
It is a coastal transitional marine and non-marine pebble and cobble conglomerate deposit and marine sandstone rock with marine fossils, from a former bay, deposited during the Middle Pliocene to Late Pliocene ages (2–3 million years ago), of the Pliocene period during the Cenozoic Era.

This formation is found from the south side of Mount Soledad in San Diego County to Rosarito Beach in northern Baja California, including Tijuana, Mexico, and the southwestern corner of San Diego County from San Ysidro to Pacific Beach.

San Diego Formation deposits were formed in a large, open, crescent-shaped bay similar in size to Monterey Bay that existed on the coast in Pliocene times.

=== Aquifer ===
The formation contains the San Diego Formation Basin, a large aquifer under Imperial Beach, Chula Vista, National City, and southern portions of the city of San Diego. The San Diego Formation Basin is a confined shallow aquifer. It has a basin ground surface area of 79,724 acres (32,263 ha) and an estimated groundwater storage capacity of 960,000 acre-feet. The depth to groundwater is about 100 feet (30 m). The groundwater in the San Diego Formation is brackish, and its quality is considered to be fair to poor. Due to its proximity to the ocean, the risk of seawater intrusion is a primary concern regarding water quality. To avoid intrusion, the Sweetwater Authority constantly monitors the basin water levels, which have remained stable since the 1980s. A factor that contributes to limit the groundwater pumping is the importation of Colorado River water. However, to reduce demands for imported water, desalination plants have been installed. The Richard A. Reynolds Groundwater Desalination Facility, in Chula Vista, was completed in 1999 and holds a production capacity of 4 million US gal (15 million L) of drinking water per day. The Claude "Bud" Lewis Carlsbad Desalination Plant in Carlsbad, California, was completed in 2015 and produces 50 million US gal (190 million L) of water per day. In this way, these plants contribute to reducing vulnerability and secure water supply, especially during drought periods. The use of groundwater contributes to a regional effort to reduce demands for imported water.

=== Fossil content ===
Besides those of clams and other mollusks, quite a few bird fossils (which are generally rare) have been found in this geological formation. Among them is a possible ancestor of Cassin's auklet (Ptychoramphus aleuticus) and the loons Gavia concinna and G. howardae. The former was quite likely a close relative or even ancestor of the large black-headed loons; the latter was perhaps a small relative of the large grey-headed loons.

== Fauna ==
=== Cetaceans ===
==== Mysticetes ====
Mysticetes reported from the San Diego Formation
Genus	Species	Stratigraphic position	Notes	Images
Balaenoptera	B. davidsonii		An extinct rorqual belonging to Balaenoptera.	
"Balaenoptera"	"B." portisi		Formerly assigned to Balaenoptera, probably a member of Cetotheriophanes.	
Herpetocetus	H. morrowi		A cetotheriid.	
Norrisanima miocaena	N. miocaena		A stem-balaenopteroid, previously considered to be a relative of humpback whale.	

==== Odontocetes ====
Odontocetes reported from the San Diego Formation
Genus	Species	Stratigraphic position	Notes	Images
Parapontoporia	P. sternbergi		A close relative of the baiji.	
Semirostrum	S. ceruttii		A porpoise with a lower jaw extended few inches beyond the upper jaw (similar to a halfbeak).	

=== Pinnipeds ===
Pinnipeds reported from the San Diego Formation
Genus	Species	Stratigraphic position	Notes	Images
Callorhinus	C. gilmorei		A relative of the northern fur seal.	
Dusignathus	D. seftoni		A walrus.	
Valenictus	V. chulavistensis		A walrus.	

=== Sirenians ===
Sirenians reported from the San Diego Formation
Genus	Species	Stratigraphic position	Notes	Images
Hydrodamalis	H. cuestae		A close relative of the Steller's sea cow.	

== See also ==
- Geology of San Diego County, California
- Pisco Formation
- Urumaco
