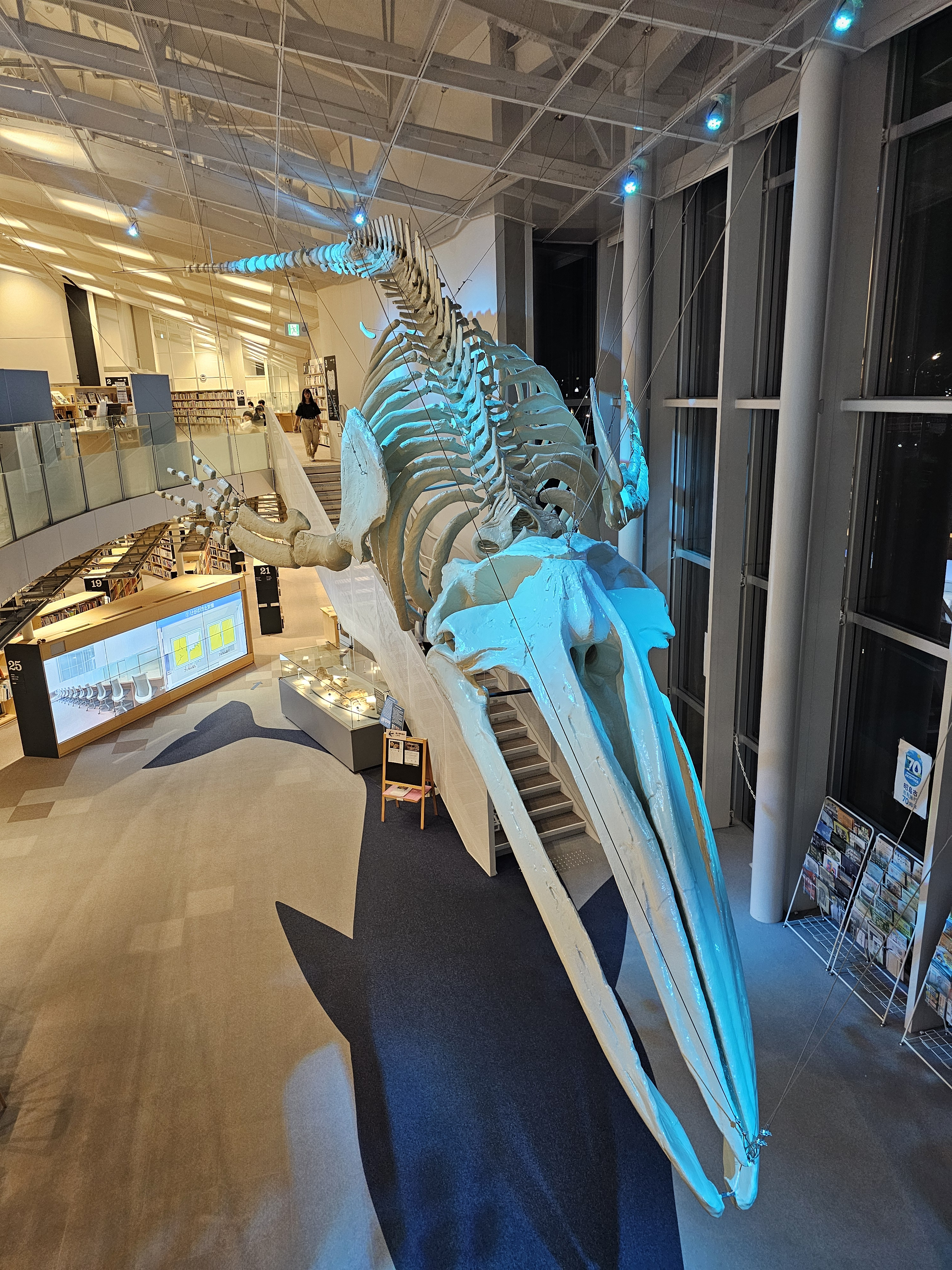

Scientific classification
- Kingdom: Animalia
- Phylum: Chordata
- Class: Mammalia
- Order: Artiodactyla
- Infraorder: Cetacea
- Family: Eschrichtiidae
- Genus: Eschrichtius
- Species: †E. akishimaensis

Binomial name
- †Eschrichtius akishimaensis Kimura, Hasegawa and Kohno, 2017

= Akishima whale =

Akishima whale Temporal range: Early Pleistocene c. 1.77–1.95 Ma

Extinct species of whale

Eschrichtius akishimaensis, described in 2017, is one of two species, with the modern day gray whale, of the genus Eschrichtius, and is the first and only fossil species of the genus, dating to around 1.77–1.95 million years ago (mya) in the Early Pleistocene.

== History of discovery ==
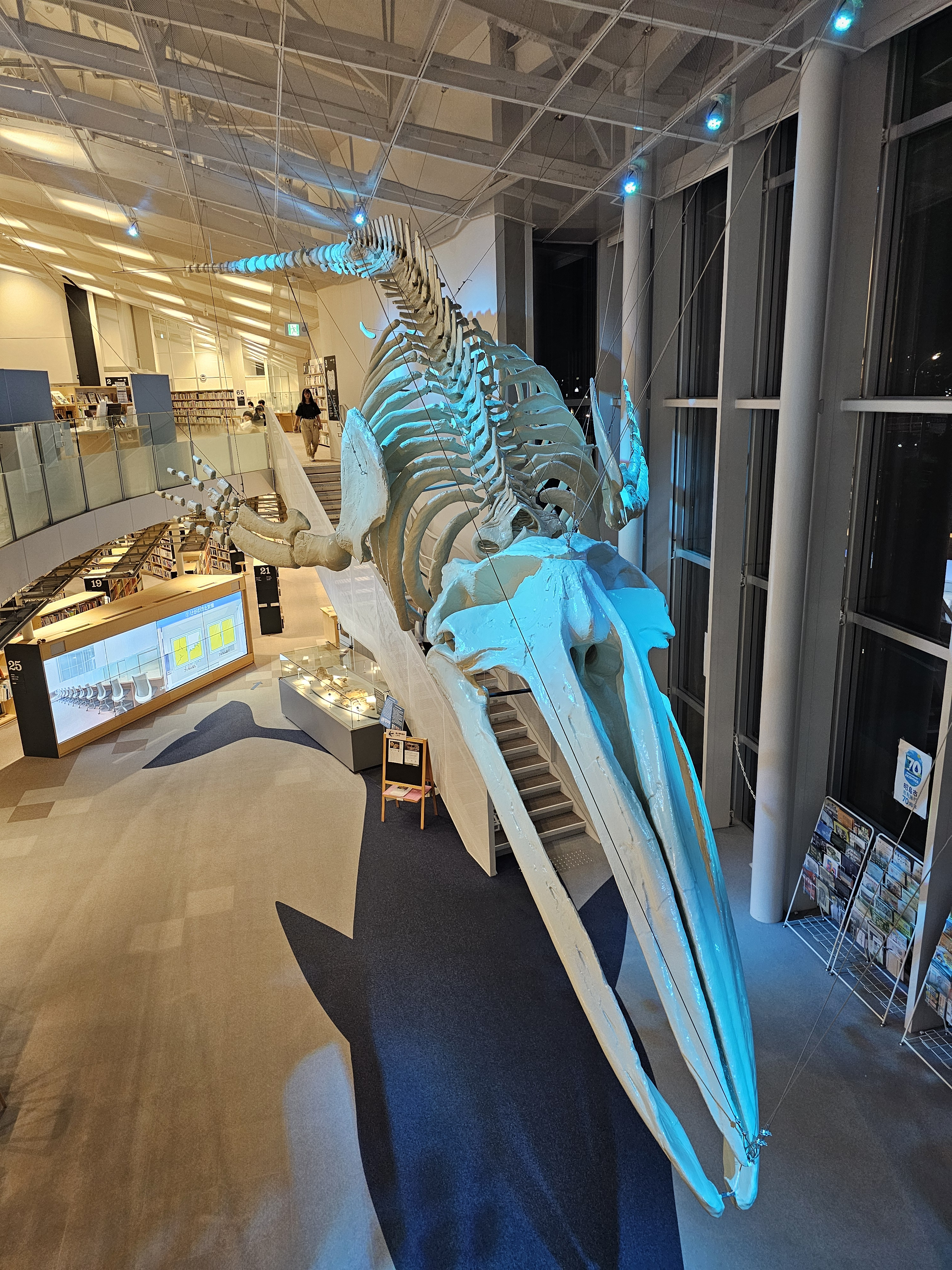
Full size fossil replica

The bones were first found in 1961 by a father and son, Masato and Yoshio Tajima, in a riverbed in Akishima, Tokyo, lending it the nickname of the Akishima whale. It was prepared by locals, under the mentorship of Hiroshi Ozaki, and subsequently put into storage at the National Museum of Nature and Science until it was transferred to Gunma Museum of Natural History to be studied. The discovery generated local enthusiasm in the city, having both a Kujira matsuri (whale festival) and a Kujira Park (Whale Park) in its honor, and plans for a life-size replica skeleton in a new educational facility to open March 2020.

Prior to its formal description, E. akishimaensis was referred to as "Japonocetus" akishimensis, though the name was never used in any way that fulfils the International Code of Zoological Nomenclature's requirements for species description. The species name of Eschrichtius akishimaensis derives from Akishima, Tokyo, where the holotype was discovered.

== Description ==
The only specimen of Eschrichtius akishimaensis consists of a skull, seven neck vertebrae, thirteen thoracic vertebrae, eight lumbar vertebrae, twelve tail vertebrae, chevrons, ribs, and arm bones, and has a total length of about 12 metres (39 ft). E. akishimaensis can be distinguished from E. robustus based on a number of characteristics. The posterior border of the nasal is squared off, the ascending process of the maxilla is dorsolateral and narrower compared to that of the premaxilla, and the squamosal concavity is deep and large.
