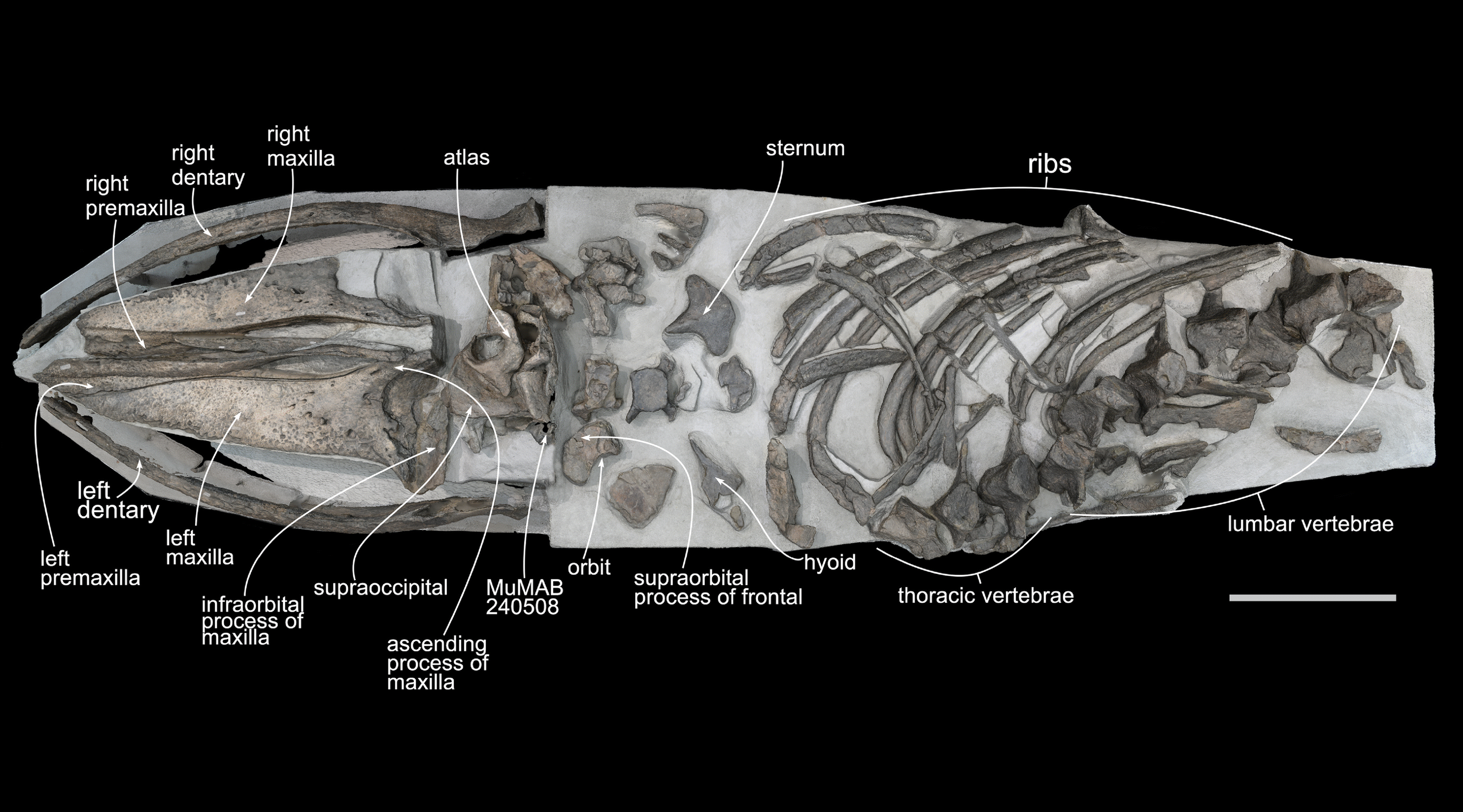
- Holotype specimen of P. quarantellii

Scientific classification
- Kingdom: Animalia
- Phylum: Chordata
- Class: Mammalia
- Infraclass: Placentalia
- Order: Artiodactyla
- Infraorder: Cetacea
- Family: Balaenopteridae
- Genus: †Plesiobalaenoptera; Bisconti, 2010

Species
- P. quarantellii (type); Bisconti, 2010

= Plesiobalaenoptera =

Plesiobalaenoptera Temporal range: Miocene (Tortonian), 11–7 Ma

Extinct genus of mammals

Plesiobalaenoptera is a genus of extinct rorqual which existed in Italy during the late Miocene epoch. The type species is P. quarantellii. It is the oldest known rorqual from the Mediterranean basin. Fossils have been found from sediments of the Stirone River in Northern Italy (44.8°N 10.0°E, paleocoordinates 43.9°N 10.5°E) that were deposited during the Tortonian age, around 11 to 7 million years ago.

== Description ==
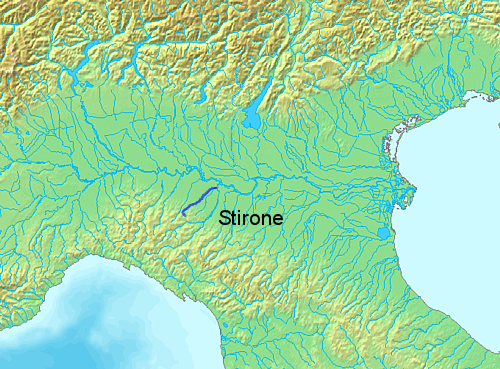
Plesiobalaenoptera fossils have been found in sediments of the Stirone River in northern Italy.

Plesiobalaenoptera was similar in appearance to other rorquals, although it had a relatively wider rostrum than other whales. The genus has several distinguishing features mainly seen in the region of the ear. For example, the periotic bone (which surrounds the inner ear) has a raised central portion and a triangular projection at its front.

Like all baleen whales, the tympanic bulla, which surrounds the middle ear, is enlarged and separate from the periotic bone. However, its tympanic bulla has a distinctive high keel. Moreover, the opening of the Eustachian tube into the middle ear is in a high position.

== Paleobiology ==
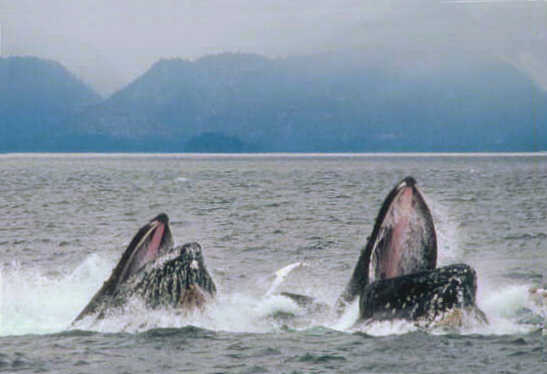
Modern humpback whales ram feeding.

Unlike living rorquals, Plesiobalaenoptera was probably not capable of ram feeding. During ram feeding, modern whales swim toward their prey with open mouths and engulf them in an expandable throat.

Plesiobalaenoptera has a postcoronoid fossa, or hole in the dentary bone of the lower jaw, which would have made this method of feeding difficult to perform.

== Classification ==
Plesiobalaenoptera is closely related to Parabalaenoptera, known from the late Miocene of California in the United States. The two form a clade that is the sister taxon of crown balaenopterids, which includes the last common ancestor of the living Balaenoptera and Megaptera, and all of its descendants.
