= "Balaenoptera" ryani =

"Balaenoptera" ryani Temporal range: late Miocene, 11.6-7.2 Ma

Scientific classification
- Kingdom: Animalia
- Phylum: Chordata
- Class: Mammalia
- Order: Artiodactyla
- Infraorder: Cetacea
- Family: Balaenopteridae
- Genus: Balaenoptera
- Species: †B. ryani

Binomial name
- †Balaenoptera ryani Hanna & McLellan, 1924

Extinct species of mammal

"Balaenoptera" ryani is an extinct species of Balaenopteridae from the late Miocene of California. It was originally considered a species of Balaenoptera, but is now recognized as more primitive than any extant or fossil balaenopterid and thus in need of a new generic name.

== Taxonomy ==
The holotype of this species is CASG 1733, a partial skull from the Late Miocene (Tortonian) Monterey Formation of Saucito Rancho, California. In their description of Parabalaenoptera, Zeigler et al. (1997) assigned B. ryani to Cetotheriidae, but a recent overview of fossil balaenopterid taxa considers it a distinct genus of balaenopterid based on a unique combination of primitive and derived characters.

== Description ==
Demere et al. (2005) note that Balaenoptera ryani can be diagnosed by a unique combination of characters found in both Balaenopteridae and non-balaenopterid thalassotheres: a supraorbital process of the frontal abruptly depressed below vertex, parietals overlapping posteromedial corner of the supraorbital process of frontal, sinuous and horizontally oriented squamosal cleft, lambdoidal crests broadly overhanging temporal fossa, and petrosal with triangular anterior process, sharply triangular supraoccipital shield, parietal narrowly exposed on vertex, and no overlap between the anterior wing of the parietal and ascending process of the maxilla.
