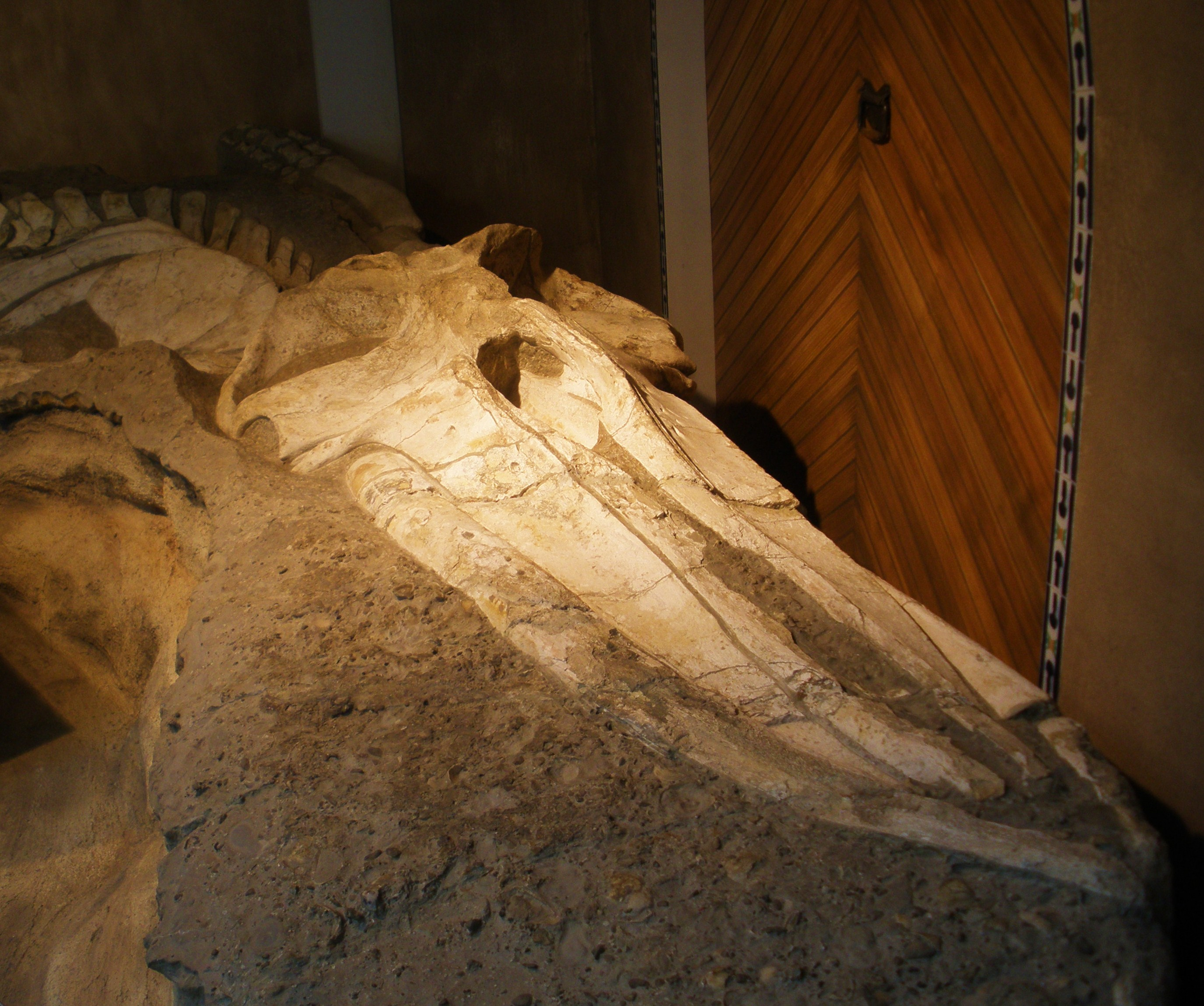
- Balaenoptera siberi

Scientific classification
- Domain: Eukaryota
- Kingdom: Animalia
- Phylum: Chordata
- Class: Mammalia
- Order: Artiodactyla
- Infraorder: Cetacea
- Family: Balaenopteridae
- Genus: Balaenoptera
- Species: †B. siberi

Binomial name
- †Balaenoptera siberi Pilleri & Pilleri 1989

= Balaenoptera siberi =

Balaenoptera siberi Temporal range: Late Tortonian-Messinian (Huayquerian-Montehermosan) ~8.0–5.75 Ma

Extinct species of whales

Balaenoptera siberi is an extinct species of baleen whale from the Late Miocene, described by Pilleri and Pilleri in 1989, based on fossils found in the Pisco Formation of the Pisco Basin in southwestern Peru.

== Description ==
The baleen whale fossils comprise a complete skeleton, including the skull, baleen, mandibles, flippers, and vertebral column. The holotype fossils are housed in a private collection, belonging to Allejandro Pezzia Asserto, while a paratype is stored in the Staatliches Museum für Naturkunde in Stuttgart, Germany. The skull of the whale has a length of 228 centimetres (7.48 ft) and a width of 111 centimetres (44 in) and intermediate in size between Balaenoptera acutorostrata and B. borealis.

=== Age ===
Fossils of the species were found in two different locations in the Pisco Formation; Aguada de Lomas, and Sacaco (SAO horizon). At time of description of the species, the sediments at Aguada de Loma ranged in age from the Late Miocene to Late Pliocene, with the layer the fossils were found dated to about 8 Ma (Huayquerian). Subsequent dating of the sediments by Marx and Fordyce in 2015 gave a late Tortonian to early Messinian range of 7.0 to 8.0 Ma.

The sediments at Sacaco were previously thought to be early Late Pliocene (3.9 Ma), while Ehret et al. in 2012 defined a Messinian age of more than 5.75 Ma for this unit of the Pisco Formation.

== Paleoecology ==
The Pisco Formation has provided many fossils of marine mammals, including several toothed whales (Acrophyseter, Koristocetus, Scaphokogia, Livyatan and more), other baleen whales (Incakujira, Miocaperea and Piscobalaena, among others), porpoises (Lomacetus and Piscolithax), seals (Hadrokirus, Piscophoca and Australophoca), marine (Hemisyntrachelus) and river dolphins (Brachydelphis and Brujadelphis), and the swimming sloth Thalassocnus. Additionally, fossil penguins and other birds (such as Pelagornis) and shark teeth, among others of megalodon, were found in the fossiliferous Pisco Formation.
