= Glaucabalaena =

Glaucabalaena Temporal range: Pliocene (Zanclean–Piacenzian), 3.8–3 Ma
- Digital reconstruction of Glaucabalaena inopinata

Scientific classification
- Kingdom: Animalia
- Phylum: Chordata
- Class: Mammalia
- Order: Artiodactyla
- Infraorder: Cetacea
- Family: Eschrichtiidae
- Genus: †Glaucabalaena; Bisconti et al., 2024

Type species
- †Glaucabalaena inopinata Bisconti et al., 2024

Extinct genus of whale

Glaucabalaena is an extinct genus of gray whale that lived during the Pliocene epoch. The genus is known from a single species, Glaucabalaena inopinata, which was described in 2024 by Michelangelo Bisconti and colleagues based on the holotype specimen MGPT-PU 19512. This specimen consists of fragments of the skull and mandible, and was recovered from the Sabbie d'Asti Formation of Piedmont, Italy.

== Etymology ==
The genus name Glaucabalaena is a combination of glauca, from the Latin glaucus, which means 'gray', and balaena, which means 'whale'. The specific name, inopinata, is from the Latin word inopinatus, meaning 'unexpected'. The type species name is so because Bisconti stated that he and his colleagues did not expect to find a second gray whale species from Pliocene-era Piedmont.
