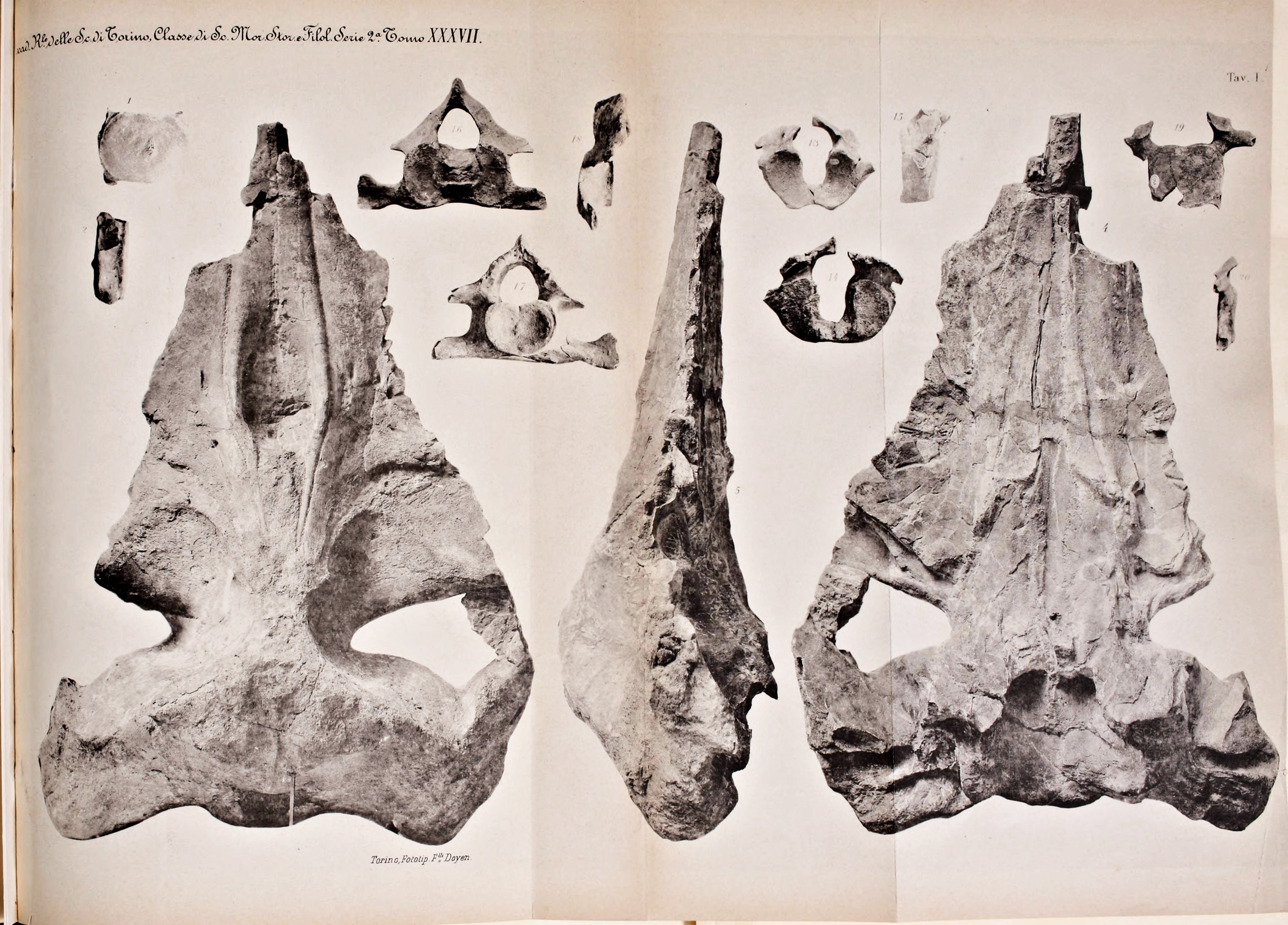
- Eschrichtioides gastaldii, from Portis 1885

Scientific classification
- Domain: Eukaryota
- Kingdom: Animalia
- Phylum: Chordata
- Class: Mammalia
- Order: Artiodactyla
- Infraorder: Cetacea
- Family: Eschrichtiidae
- Genus: †Eschrichtioides; Bisconti 2008

Species
- †E. gastaldii Strobel 1881

Synonyms
- †Balaenoptera gastaldii Portis 1885; †Cetotherium gastaldii Strobel 1881

= Eschrichtioides =

Eschrichtioides Temporal range: Pliocene

Extinct genus of mammals

Eschrichtioides is an extinct genus of baleen whale known from the early Pliocene of Northern Italy. Its type species, E. gastaldii, had a complex taxonomic history, starting as a cetothere, then as an extinct member of Balaenoptera, before being finally recognized as a relative of the gray whale.

== Distribution ==
Eschrichtioides is one of two Eschrichtius relatives known from the Neogene of Italy, the other being Archaeschrichtius. Its holotype, MRSN 13802, comes from the early Pliocene-age Sabbie d'Asti Formation of the Piedmont region in Italy and it is currently exposed in Asti's paleontological museum "Museo Paleontologico Territoriale dell'Astigiano".

== Classification ==
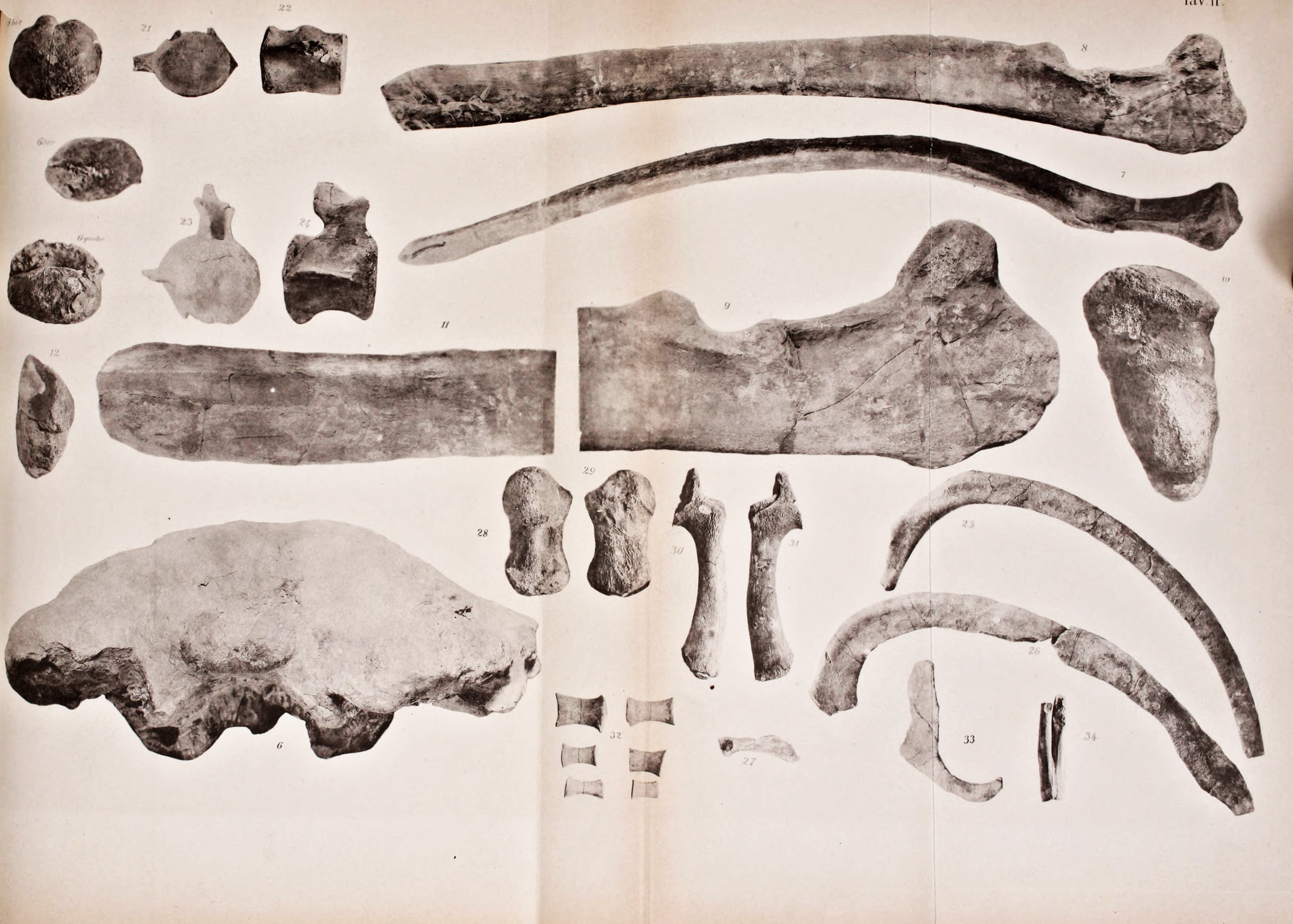
Mandible, skull, and postcranial elements of Eschrichtioides gastaldii from Portis 1885

Like other cetaceans from the Italian Pliocene, the classification of Eschrichtioides was highly contentious.

Brandt 1873 described several species of Cetotherium from the Pliocene of northern Italy, including C. cortesi based on a specimen (MSRN 13802) found by Italian geologist Giuseppe Cortesi in 1816 near the town Cortandone (45.0°N 8.1°E: paleocoordinates 44.9°N 8.0°E)

Cortesi 1819 described how he, after a day of searching for fossils, found what he first thought was a small piece of wood in a small river. After a closer inspection it proved to be a bone, and Cortesi and his companion found more and more of them in the banks of the river. After four days of digging they had unveiled a giant skeleton easily identifiable as a whale 12 feet 5 inches long. The three feet long head and its dentaries had no signs of either teeth nor tooth sockets. Cortesi noted that at that time few naturalists could assign cetacean fossils to individual species, and he therefore never named his specimen.

Desmoulins 1822 thought the "Baleine de Cortesi" represented a distinctive species because it was a very small adult individual and because the curvature of the maxillary branches was less convex than in any other known whale. Other French naturalists named it "Le rorqual de Cortési"; arguing that both Cortesi's fossil whales ("rorqual de Cortési" and "de Cuvier") were closely related to extant rorquals and the only difference between them was the much smaller size of the former.

Brandt 1873 assigned the "baleine de Cortesi" to his own genus Cetotherium Cortesii.

In a preliminary note Strobel 1875 pointed out differences in cranial morphology in two skulls both described as "Cetotherium cortesii" (a species named and described by Brandt 1873), and he therefore proposed the new specific name "Cetotherium gastaldii" (in honour of Italian palaeontologist Bartolomeo Gastaldi) for one of the specimens. Strobel 1881 described the specimen and reiterated his arguments from 1875.

Originally misidentified as the balaenopterid "Balaena" cortesii, Brandt 1873 described "B." cortesii as a species of Cetotherium. Strobel 1875 finally named it C. gastaldii. However, several authors considered it to be referrable to Balaenoptera, a taxonomic arrangement which was accepted for more than a century. However, re-examination of MRSN 13802 revealed that "C." gastaldii was not a balaenopterid and instead constituted its own genus within Eschrichtiidae.
