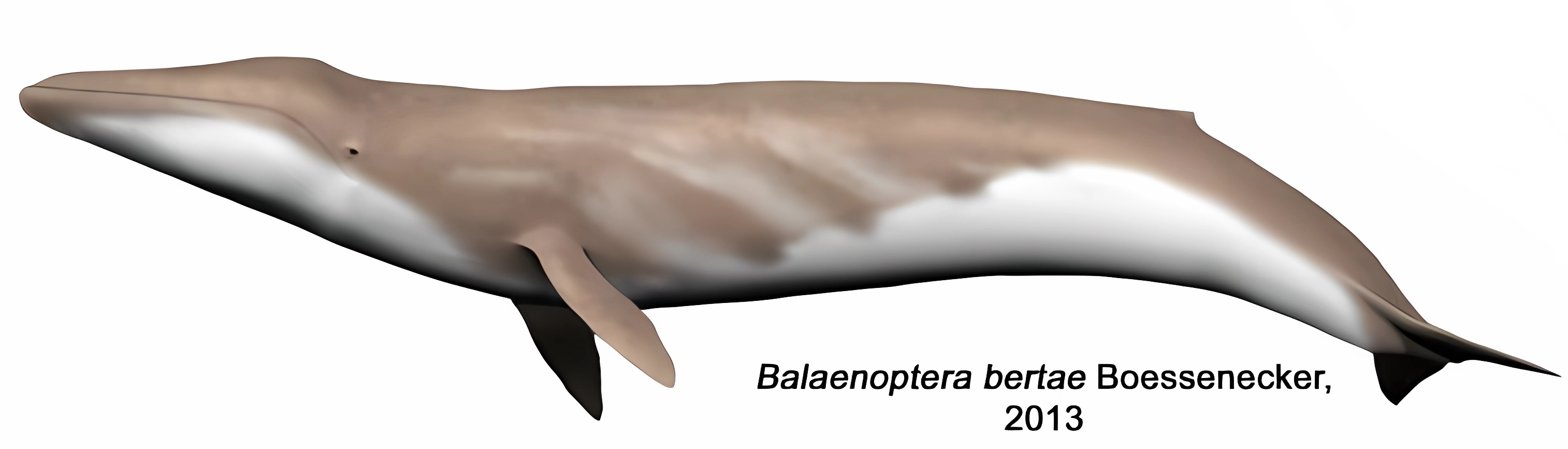
- B. bertae life restoration

Scientific classification
- Domain: Eukaryota
- Kingdom: Animalia
- Phylum: Chordata
- Class: Mammalia
- Order: Artiodactyla
- Suborder: Whippomorpha
- Infraorder: Cetacea
- Family: Balaenopteridae
- Genus: Balaenoptera
- Species: B. bertae

Binomial name
- Balaenoptera bertae Boessenecker, 2013

= Balaenoptera bertae =

Balaenoptera bertae Temporal range: Piacenzian–Gelasian ~3.35–2.5 Ma

Extinct species of mammal

Balaenoptera bertae is an extinct species of baleen whale that lived from 3.35 to 2.5 Mya during the Pliocene in the region of today's San Francisco Bay Area. Il held, also during the early to middle Neogene, a diverse assembly of cetaceans. Their fossilized remains were found in the Purisima Formation. The species Balaenoptera bertae was discovered in 2013.

== Description ==
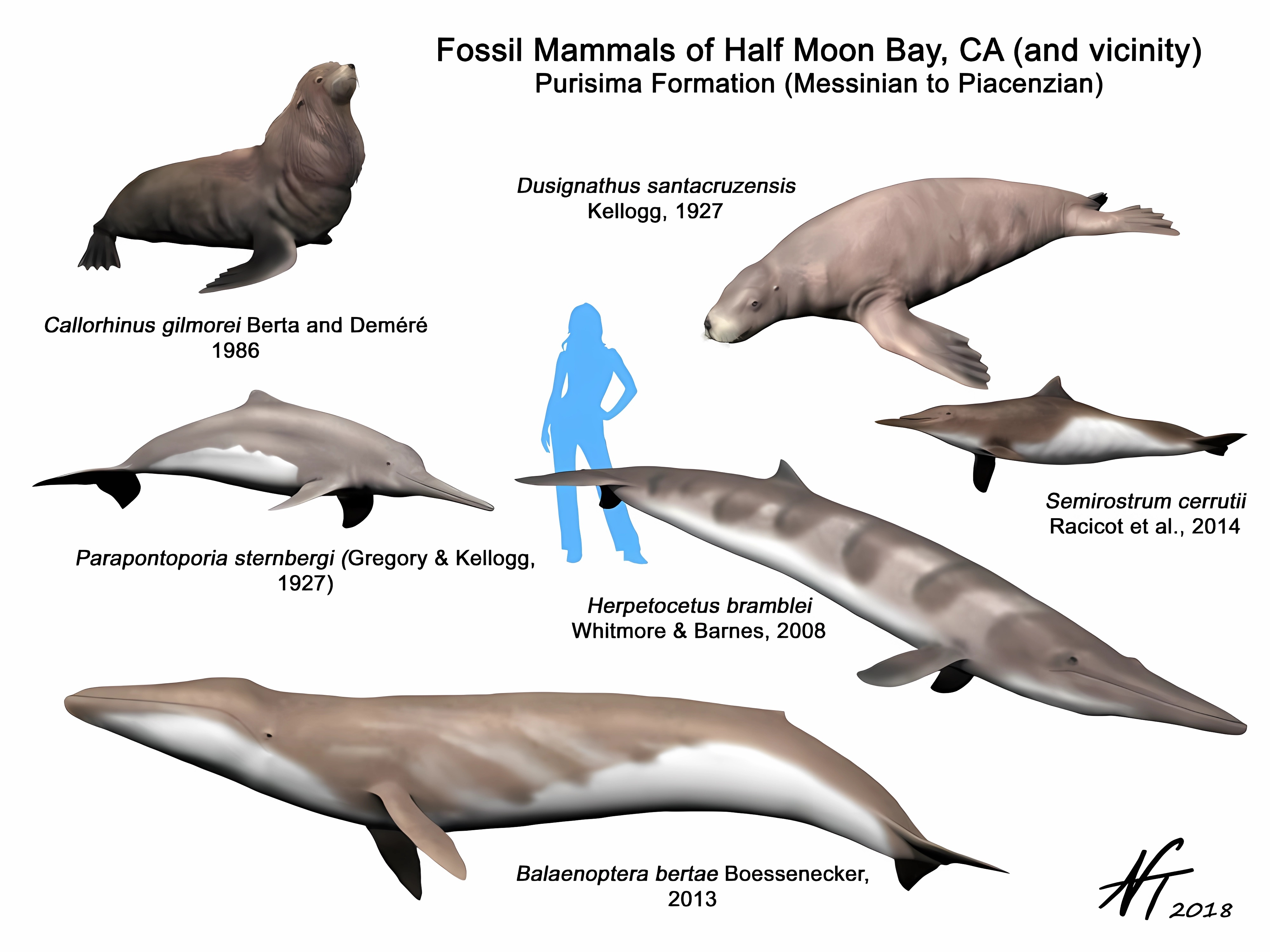
Balaenoptera bertae and other Half Moon Bay fossil mammals

Balaenoptera bertae is estimated to be 5 to 6 metres (16 to 20 ft). It is slightly smaller than the modern minke whale. It is known from a partial skull which is missing a maxilla, premaxillae and nasals.
