= Diunatans =

Diunatans Temporal range: Early Pliocene

Scientific classification
- Kingdom: Animalia
- Phylum: Chordata
- Class: Mammalia
- Order: Artiodactyla
- Infraorder: Cetacea
- Family: Balaenopteridae
- Genus: †Diunatans; Bosselaers and Post, 2010
- Species: †D. luctoretemergo

Binomial name
- †Diunatans luctoretemergo Bosselaers and Post, 2010

Extinct genus of mammals

Diunatans is an extinct genus of rorqual. It lived in the North Sea during the Early Pliocene. Two specimens have been found from the Netherlands. They were collected from the Kattendijk Formation in the province of Zeeland, which is Zanclean in age. Diunatans is considered to be a stem balaenopterid because it falls outside the Balaenoptera+Megaptera clade, which includes all living rorquals.

Its name means "long-distance swimmer", from the Latin diu meaning "long time" or "long distance", and natans, meaning "swimming". The type species is D. luctoretemergo, named after the motto of Zeeland, "Luctor et Emergo" (Latin for "I struggle and I emerge").

Diunatans was around the size of the living minke whale. Several distinguishing characteristics can be seen in the skull of Diunatans, including a large occipital condyle and very small nasal bones compared to other rorquals. The tympanic bulla, which encapsulates the middle ear, is also large.

Diunatans is the only known fossil rorqual from the North Sea. Many other fossil rorquals have been described, but all are now considered nomina dubia. English paleontologist Richard Owen named Balaenoptera definata, B. emarginata, and B. gibbosa in 1844. In the late 19th century, Belgian paleontologist Pierre-Joseph van Beneden named B. borealina, B. musculoides, B. rostratella, B. sibbaldina, Plesiocetus goropii, Megapteropsis robusta, and Megaptera affinus.
