= Nehalaennia =

Nehalaennia Temporal range: Late Miocene

Scientific classification
- Kingdom: Animalia
- Phylum: Chordata
- Class: Mammalia
- Order: Artiodactyla
- Infraorder: Cetacea
- Family: Balaenopteridae
- Genus: †Nehalaennia; Bisconti, Munstermann & Post, 2019
- Species: †N. devossi

Binomial name
- †Nehalaennia devossi Bisconti, Munstermann & Post, 2019

Extinct genus of mammals

Nehalaennia is an extinct genus of baleen whale that inhabited the North Sea during the Late Miocene. It is known from the species Nehalaennia devossi.

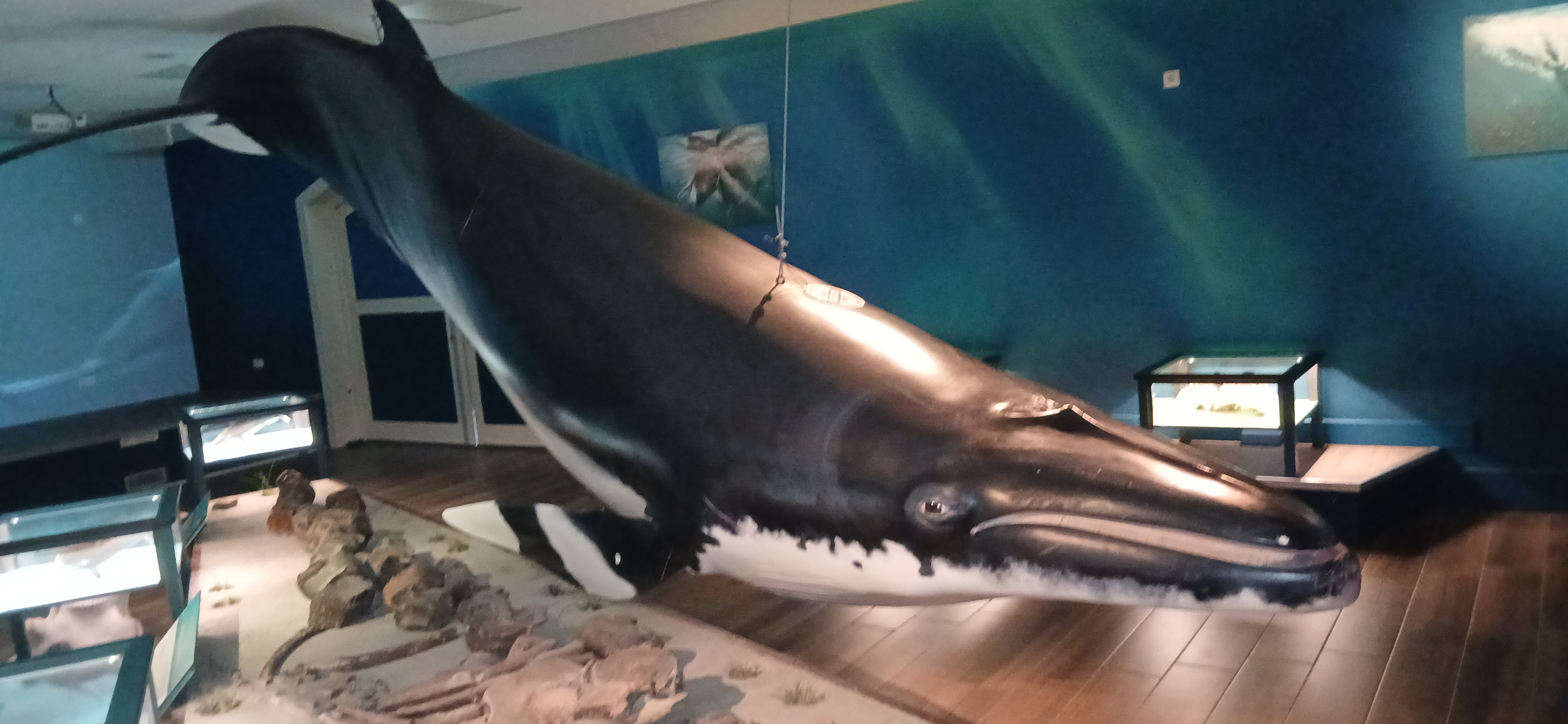
Model of Nehalaennia devossi at Historyland, Hellevoetsluis
