= Norrisanima =

Norrisanima Temporal range: Late Miocene, 7.6-7.2 Ma

Scientific classification
- Kingdom: Animalia
- Phylum: Chordata
- Class: Mammalia
- Order: Artiodactyla
- Infraorder: Cetacea
- Parvorder: Mysticeti
- Superfamily: Balaenopteroidea
- Genus: †Norrisanima; Leslie et al., 2019
- Species: †N. miocaena

Binomial name
- †Norrisanima miocaena (Kellogg, 1922)

Synonyms
- Megaptera miocaena Kellogg, 1922

Extinct genus of whale

Norrisanima miocaena is an extinct species of Balaenopteroidea from the late Miocene of California. It was originally considered a species of Megaptera, but is now considered a stem-balaenopteroid.

== Taxonomy ==
The holotype of this species is USNM 10300, a partial skull from the Late Miocene (Tortonian) Monterey Formation of Lompoc, California. Although previously included in the same genus as the humpback whale, "M." miocaena differs in having a less ventrally inflated tympanic bulla, short and rectangular nasals, and the narrow finger of the frontal is excluded from the posterior part of the nasal bones.

== Occurrences ==
The Norrisanima holotype was collected from Lompoc in Santa Barbara County, California. However, subsequent remains referred to this taxon have been unearthed in the Purisima Formation of Northern California and the San Diego Formation and San Mateo Formation of San Diego.
