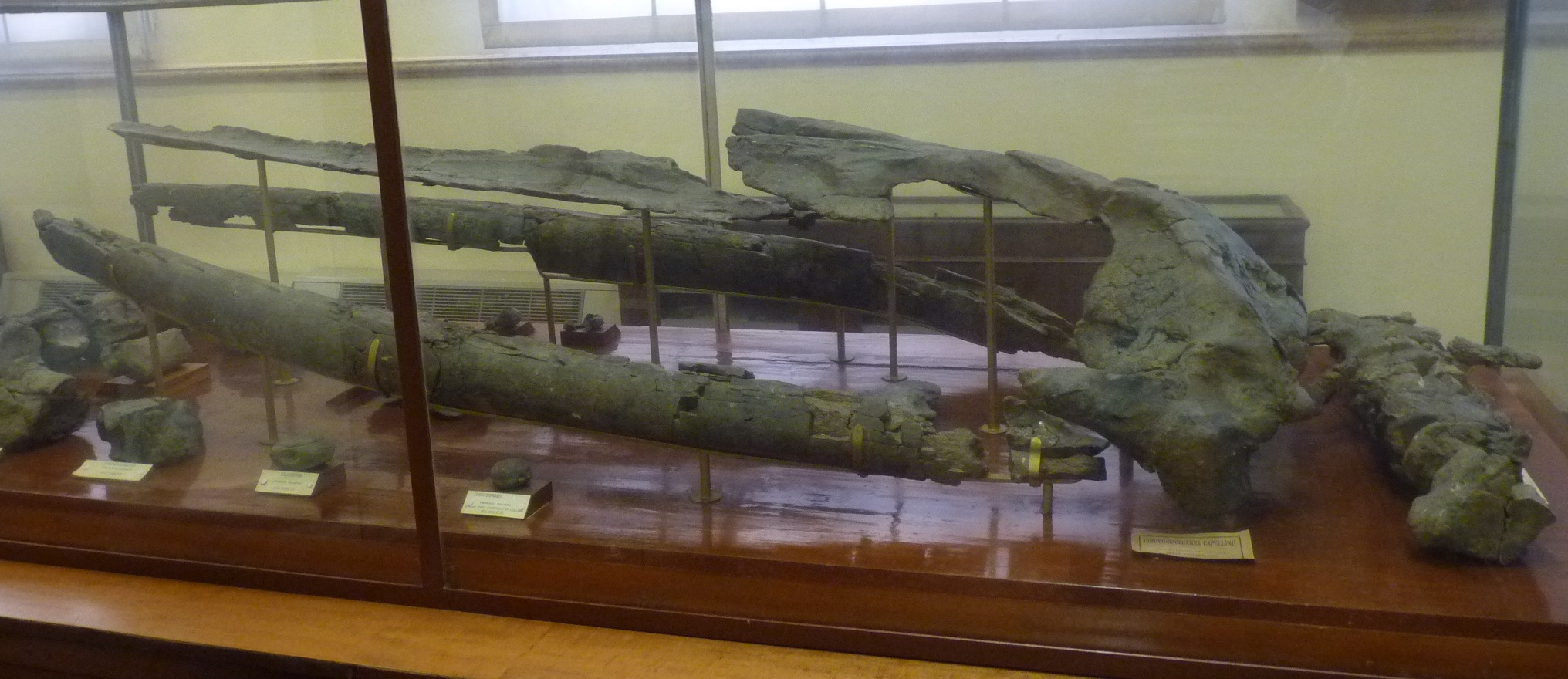
- Skull in Bologna

Scientific classification
- Domain: Eukaryota
- Kingdom: Animalia
- Phylum: Chordata
- Class: Mammalia
- Order: Artiodactyla
- Infraorder: Cetacea
- Family: Balaenopteridae; Gray 1864
- Genus: †Cetotheriophanes; Brandt 1873

Species
- †C. capellinii (Brandt, 1873) (type)

= Cetotheriophanes =

Cetotheriophanes Temporal range: late Pliocene

Extinct genus of mammals

Cetotheriophanes is an extinct rorqual from the late Pliocene (Piacenzian) of Northern Italy.

== Classification ==
Cetotheriophanes was originally described as a subgenus of Cetotherium in 1873, but later elevated to full generic status in 1875. It was later considered a synonym of Balaenoptera by some authors, but recent work suggests that Cetotheriophanes is distinct from Balaenoptera.
