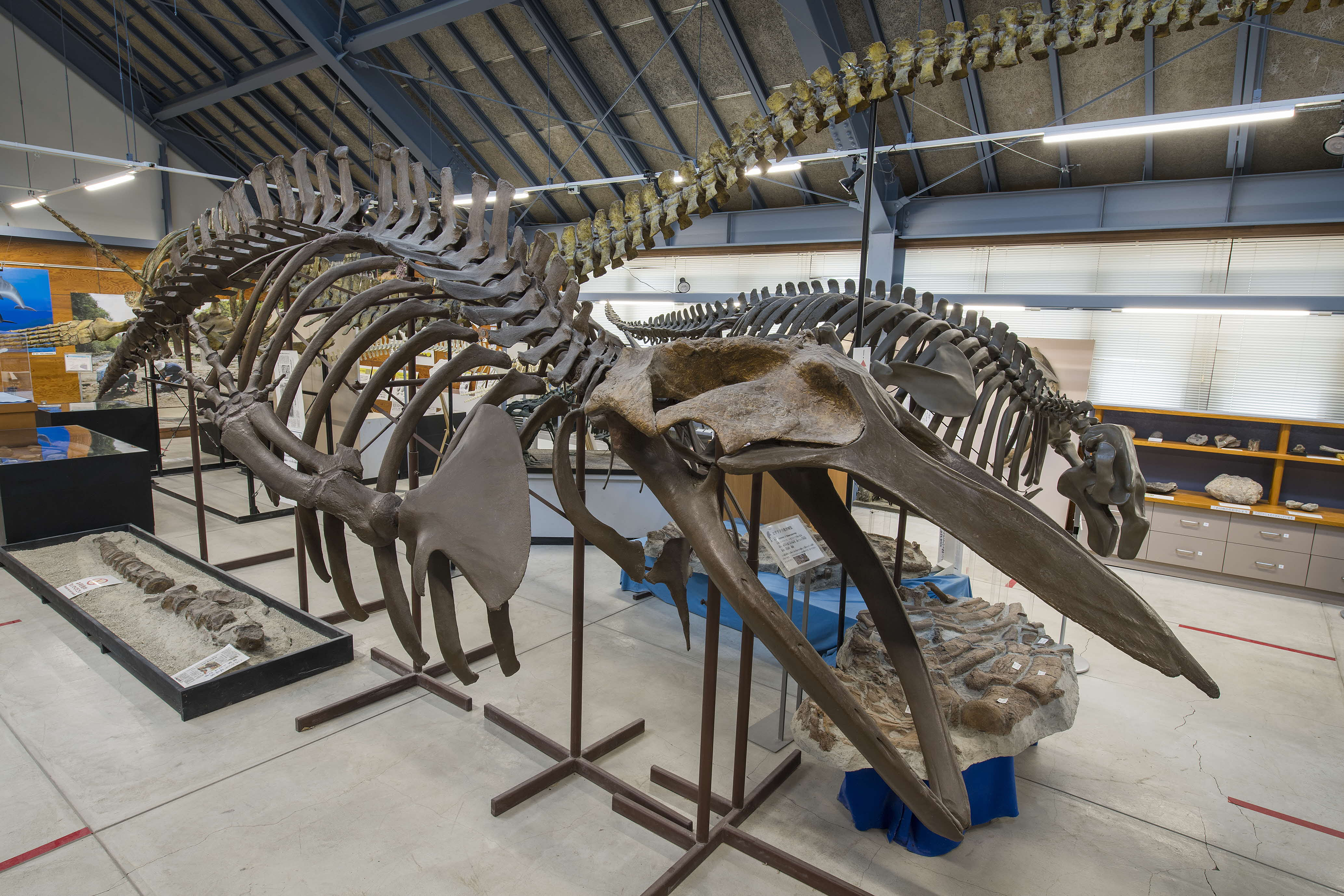
- A skeleton at Numata Fossil Museum in Numata, Hokkaido

Scientific classification
- Kingdom: Animalia
- Phylum: Chordata
- Class: Mammalia
- Infraclass: Placentalia
- Order: Artiodactyla
- Infraorder: Cetacea
- Family: Balaenopteridae
- Genus: †Miobalaenoptera; Tanaka and Watanabe, 2019

Species
- M. numataensis Tanaka and Watanabe, 2019 (type)

= Miobalaenoptera =

Miobalaenoptera Temporal range: Messinian ~6.8–6.5 Ma

Extinct genus of whales

Miobalaenoptera is an extinct genus of rorqual from the Late Miocene (Messinian) of Japan.

== Description ==
Miobalaenoptera is distinguished from other rorquals (both extinct and extant) in the features of the earbone (incl. periotic) as well strongly diverging basioccipital crests

The holotype specimen was found in marine deposits in Numata town, Hokkaido, Japan. It was initially assigned to Balaenoptera cf. acutorostrata by Shinohara (2012) and thought to be Pliocene in age, but analysis of diatoms in the matrix and preparation showed it to not only late Miocene but also a distinct species of extinct rorqual.
