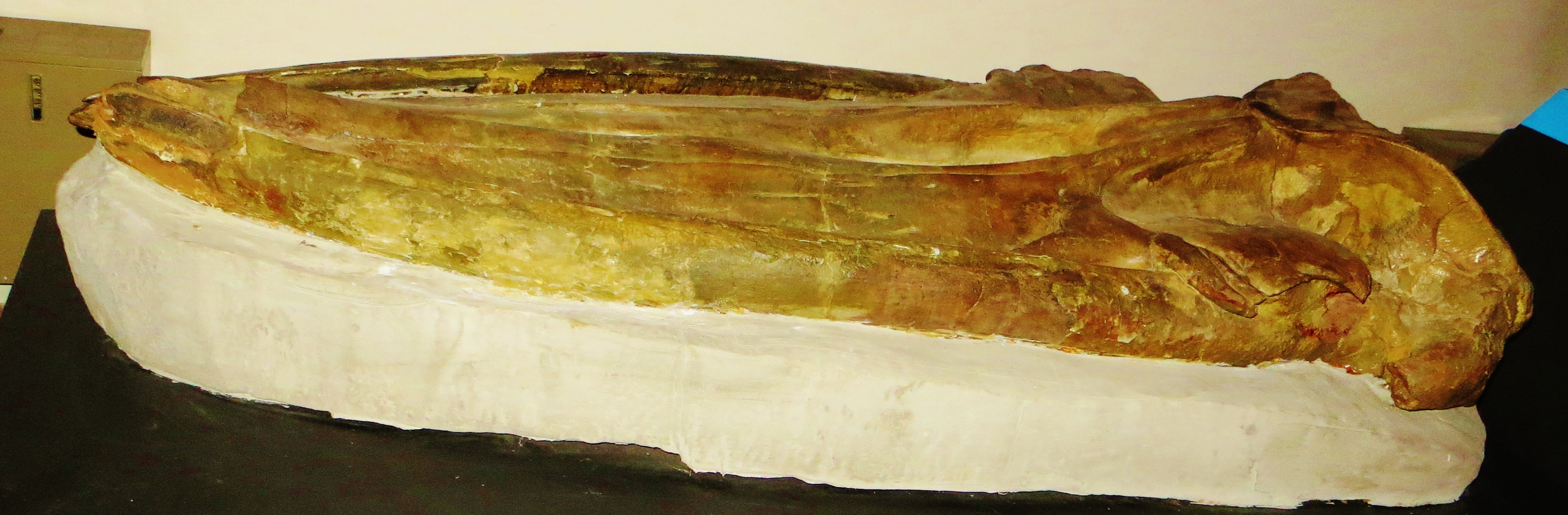
- Skull

Scientific classification
- Kingdom: Animalia
- Phylum: Chordata
- Class: Mammalia
- Infraclass: Placentalia
- Order: Artiodactyla
- Infraorder: Cetacea
- Family: Balaenopteridae
- Genus: †Archaebalaenoptera; Bisconti, 2007

Species
- † A. castriarquati (type) Bisconti, 2007; †A. eusebioi Bisconti et al, 2022; †A. liesselensis Bisconti, 2020

= Archaebalaenoptera =

Archaebalaenoptera Temporal range: late Miocene–Pliocene

Extinct genus of mammals

Archaebalaenoptera is a genus of extinct rorqual known from late Miocene to Pliocene-age marine deposits of the Netherlands, Northern Italy, and Peru.

== Classification ==
The type species, A. castriarquati, was discovered in 1983 from the sediments of the late Pliocene (Piacenzian) Castell’Arquato Formation in northern Italy. A cladistic analysis of Balaenopteridae recovered Archaebalaenoptera as one of if not the most primitive rorqual. A second Archaebalaenoptera species, A. liesselensis, is known from the late Miocene (late Tortonian) Breda Formation near Liessel, in the Netherlands while an unnamed species is known from Peru. A. liesselensis differs from the type species and the unnamed Peruvian species in being larger.

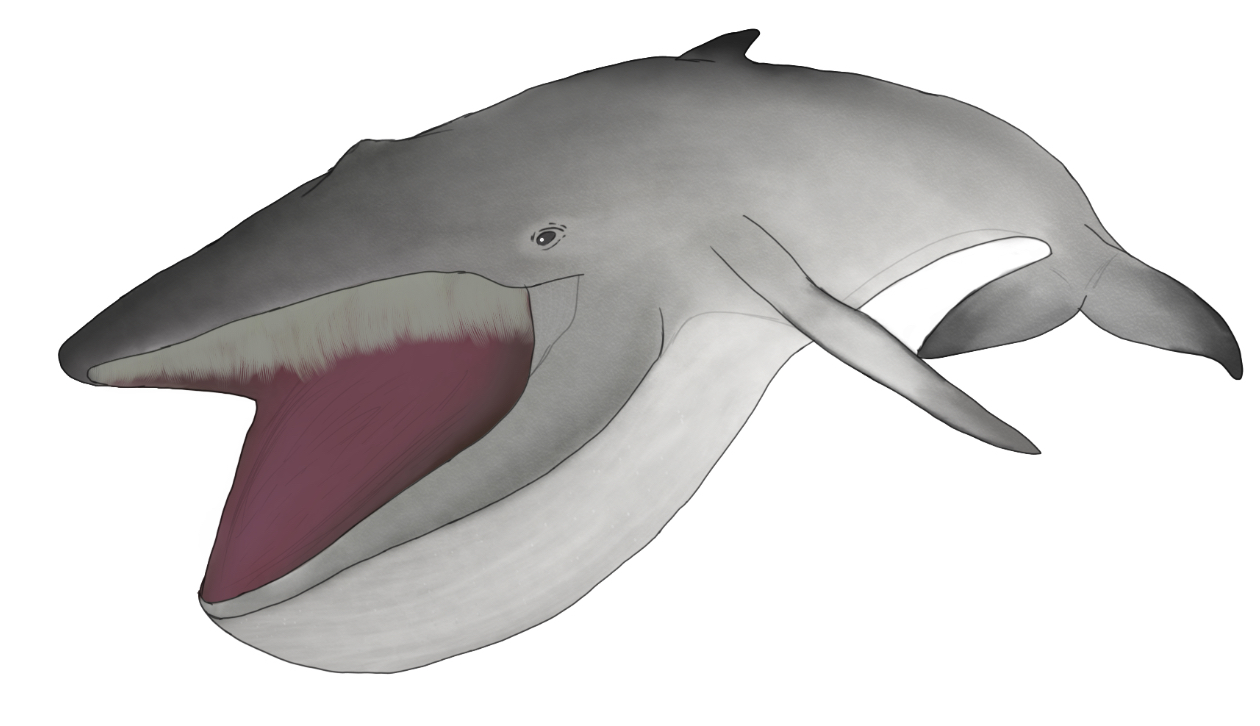
A reconstruction of the primitive rorqual A. liesselensis

== Paleobiology ==
The primitive morphology of the jaw suggests that Archaebalaenoptera probably was not capable of ram feeding like living rorquals and humpback whales.
