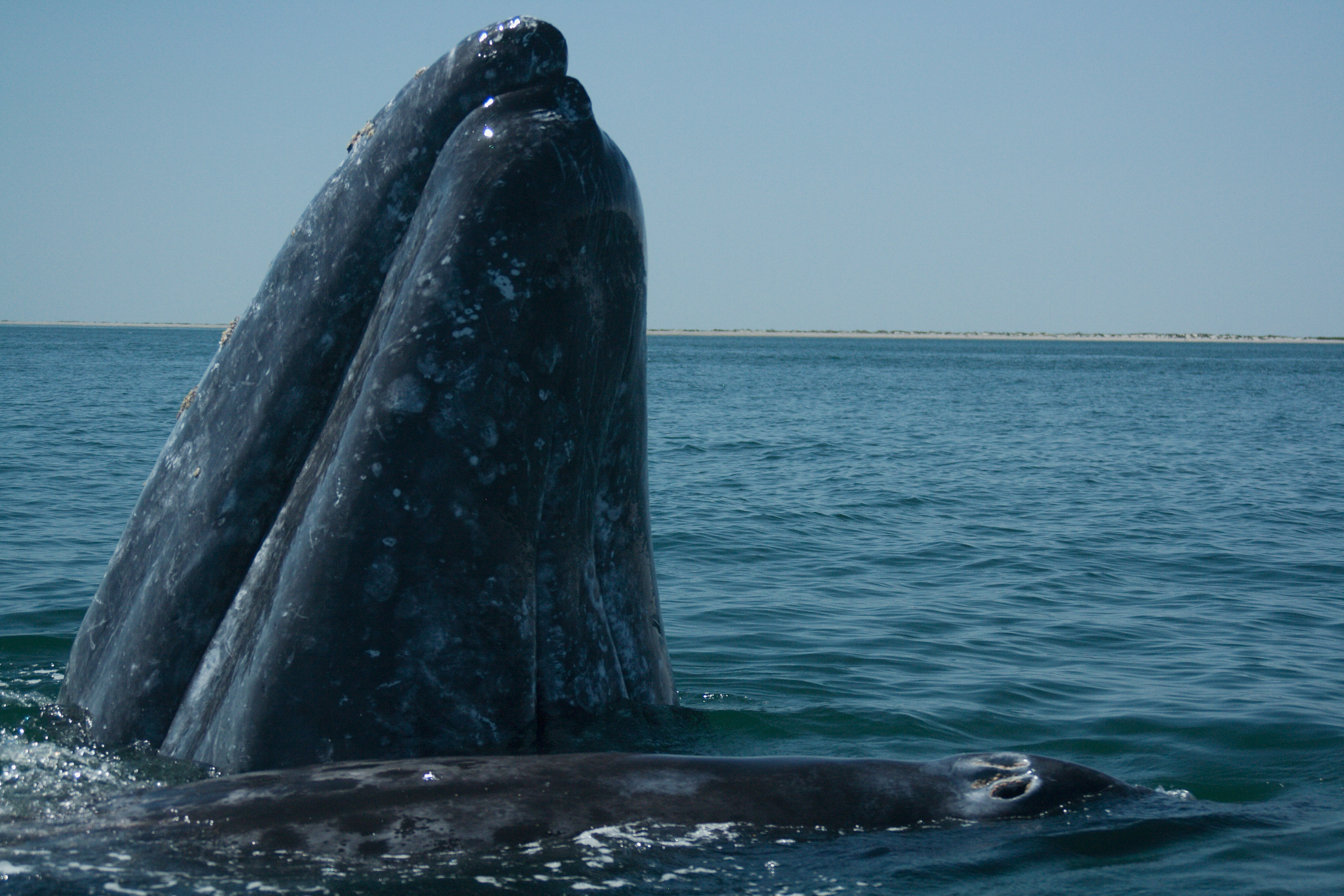
- Gray whale spy-hopping next to calf

Scientific classification
- Domain: Eukaryota
- Kingdom: Animalia
- Phylum: Chordata
- Class: Mammalia
- Order: Artiodactyla
- Infraorder: Cetacea
- Family: Eschrichtiidae
- Genus: Eschrichtius; Gray, 1864

Species
- Eschrichtius robustus; †Eschrichtius akishimaensis

= Eschrichtius =

Eschrichtius Temporal range: 3.7–0 Ma

Genus of baleen whale

Eschrichtius is a genus of baleen whale containing two species: the gray whale (E. robustus) and the extinct Akishima whale (E. akishimaensis).
