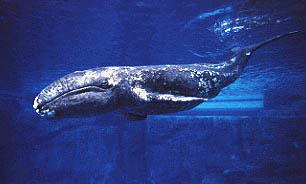

Scientific classification
- Kingdom: Animalia
- Phylum: Chordata
- Class: Mammalia
- Order: Artiodactyla
- Infraorder: Cetacea
- Parvorder: Mysticeti
- Family: Eschrichtiidae; Ellerman & Morrison-Scott 1951

Genera
- †Archaeschrichtius Bisconti & Varola 2006; †Eschrichtioides Bisconti 2008; Eschrichtius Gray 1864; †Glaucabalaena Bisconti et al. 2024; †Gricetoides Whitmore & Kaltenbach 2008

Synonyms
- Rhachianectidae Weber 1904

= Eschrichtiidae =

Eschrichtiidae Temporal range: Late Miocene–Recent

Family of mammals

Eschrichtiidae or the gray whales (British English: grey whales) is a family of baleen whale (Parvorder Mysticeti) with a single extant species, the gray whale (Eschrichtius robustus), as well as four described fossil genera: Archaeschrichtius (Miocene), Glaucabalaena and Eschrichtioides (Pliocene) from Italy, and Gricetoides from the Pliocene of North Carolina. Some phylogenetic studies have found this family to be invalid, with its members nesting inside of the clade Balaenopteridae. The names of the extant genus and the family honours Danish zoologist Daniel Eschricht.

== Taxonomy ==
In his morphological analysis, Bisconti 2008 found that eschrichtiids and Cetotheriidae (Cetotherium, Mixocetus and Metopocetus) form a monophyletic sister group of Balaenopteridae.

A specimen from the Late Pliocene of Northern Italy, named "Cetotherium" gastaldii by Strobel 1875 and renamed "Balaenoptera" gastaldii by Portis 1885, was identified as a basal eschrichtiid by Bisconti 2008 who recombined it to Eschrichtioides gastaldii.

Steeman et al. 2009 found that the gray whale is phylogenetically distinct from rorquals and that previous morphological studies were correct in the conclusion that the evolution of gulp feeding was a single event in the rorqual lineage. In contrast, multiple later studies found the gray whale to fall within the family Balaenopteridae, being more derived than the minke whales but basal to all other members in the family, and reclassified it in Balaenopteridae; the American Society of Mammalogists has followed this classification.

== Evolution ==
Fossils of Eschrichtiidae have been found in all major oceanic basins in the Northern Hemisphere, and the family is believed to date back to the Late Miocene. Today, gray whales are only present in the northern Pacific, but a population was also present in the northern Atlantic before being driven to extinction by European whalers three centuries ago.

Fossil eschrichtiids from before the Holocene are rare compared to other fossil mysticetes. The only Pleistocene fossil from the Pacific referred to E. eschrichtius is a partial skeleton and an associated skull from California, estimated to be about 200 thousand years old. However, a late Pliocene fossil from Hokkaido, Japan, referred to Eschrichtius sp. is estimated to be 2.6 to 3.9 Mya and a similar unnamed fossil has been reported from California.

In their description of Archaeschrichtius ruggieroi from the late Miocene of Italy, Bisconti & Varola 2006 argued that eschrichtiids most likely originated in the Mediterranean Basin about 10 million years ago and remained there, either permanently or intermittently, at least until the Early Pliocene (5–3 Mya), (but see Messinian salinity crisis.)
