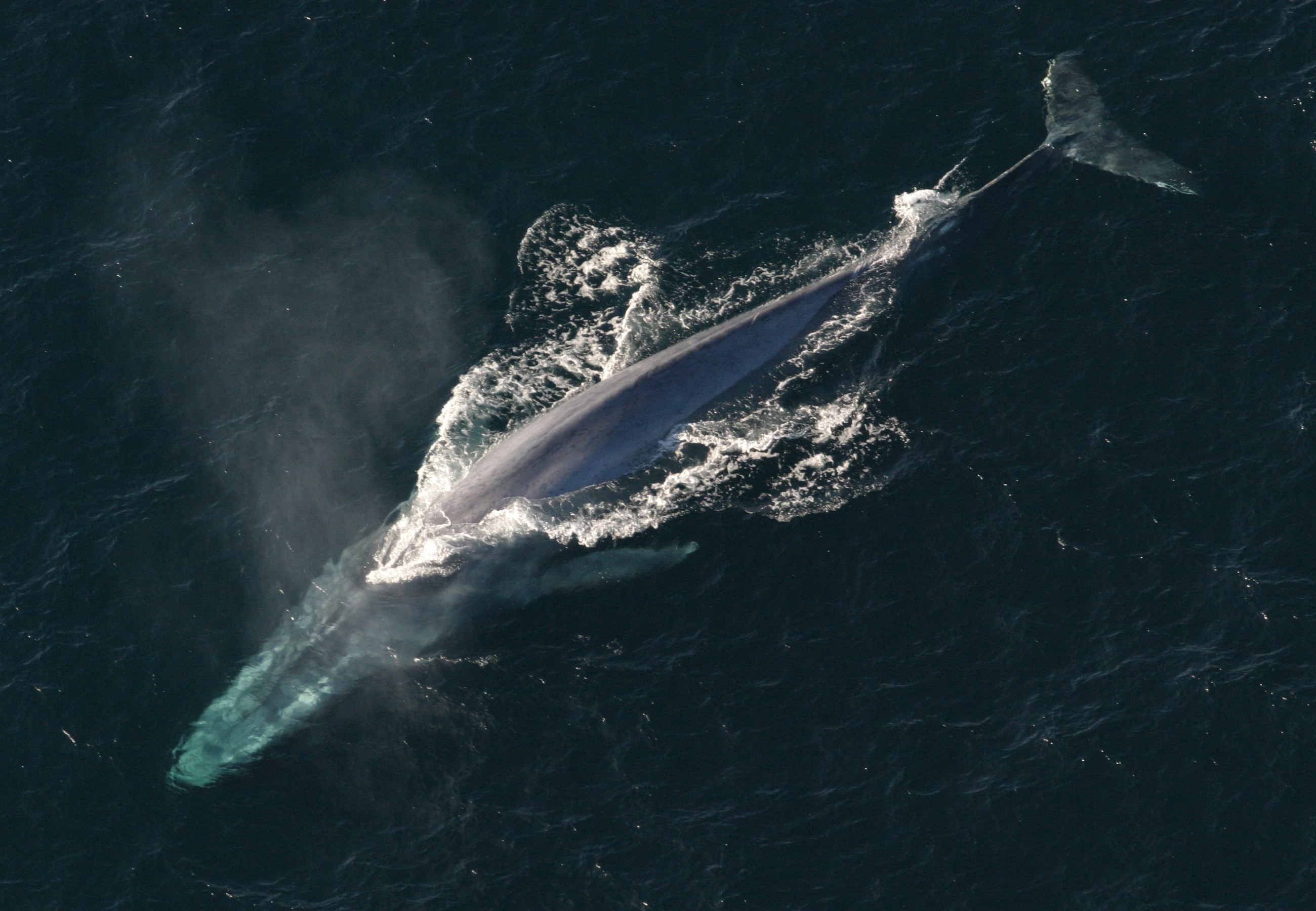
- Blue whale, Balaenoptera musculus

Scientific classification
- Kingdom: Animalia
- Phylum: Chordata
- Class: Mammalia
- Order: Artiodactyla
- Infraorder: Cetacea
- Family: Balaenopteridae
- Genus: Balaenoptera; Lacépède, 1804

Type species
- Balaena physalus Linnaeus, 1758

Species
- See text
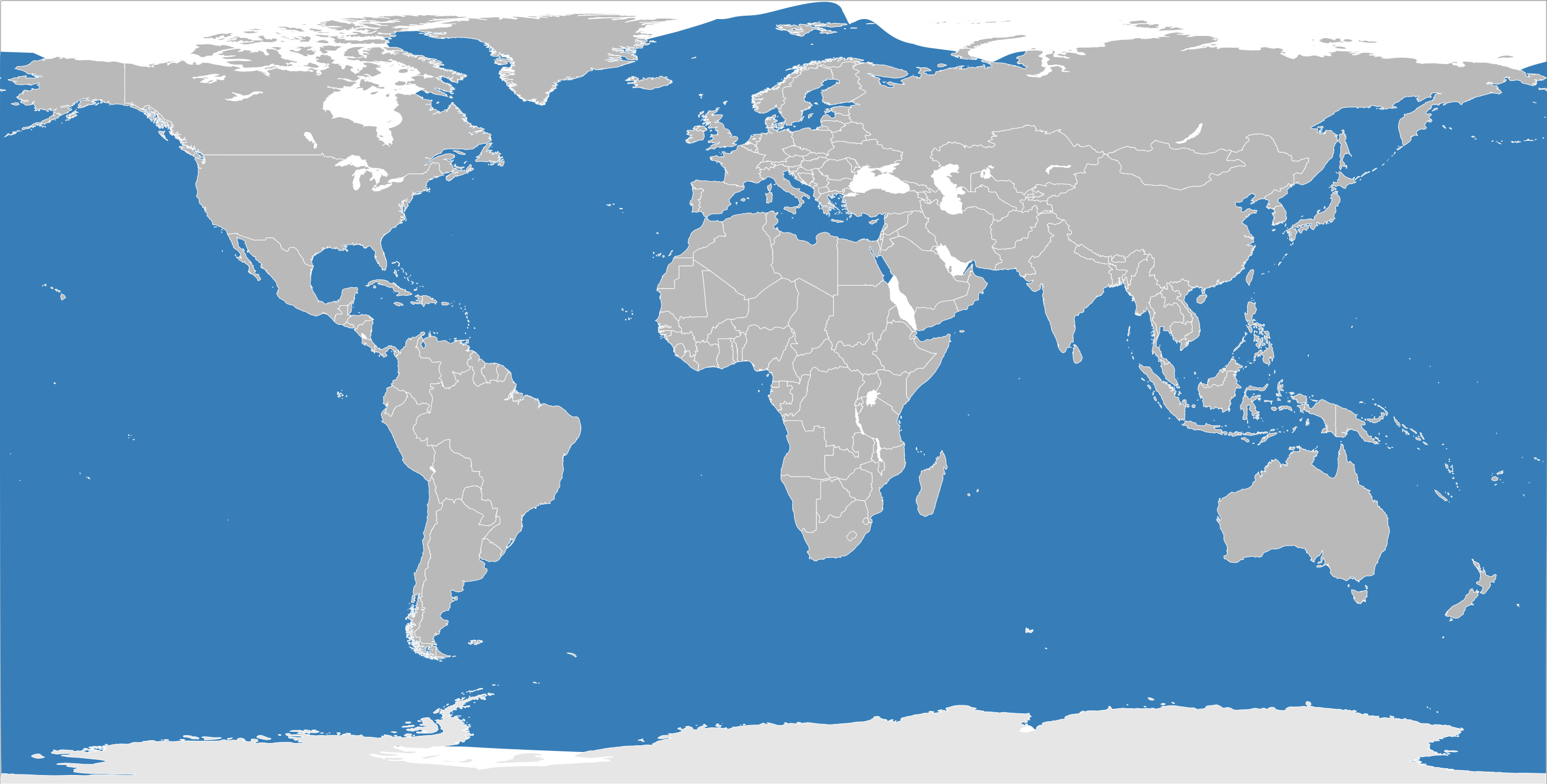
- Balaenoptera distribution

= Balaenoptera =

Balaenoptera Temporal range: Neogene–recent

Genus of mammals

Balaenoptera (from Latin balaena 'whale' and Ancient Greek πτερά (pterá) 'fin') is a genus of rorquals containing eight extant species. Balaenoptera comprises all but two of the extant species in its family (the humpback whale and gray whale); the genus is currently polyphyletic, with the two aforementioned species being phylogenetically nested within it.

This genus is known in the fossil records from the Neogene to the Quaternary (13.65 million years ago to the present).

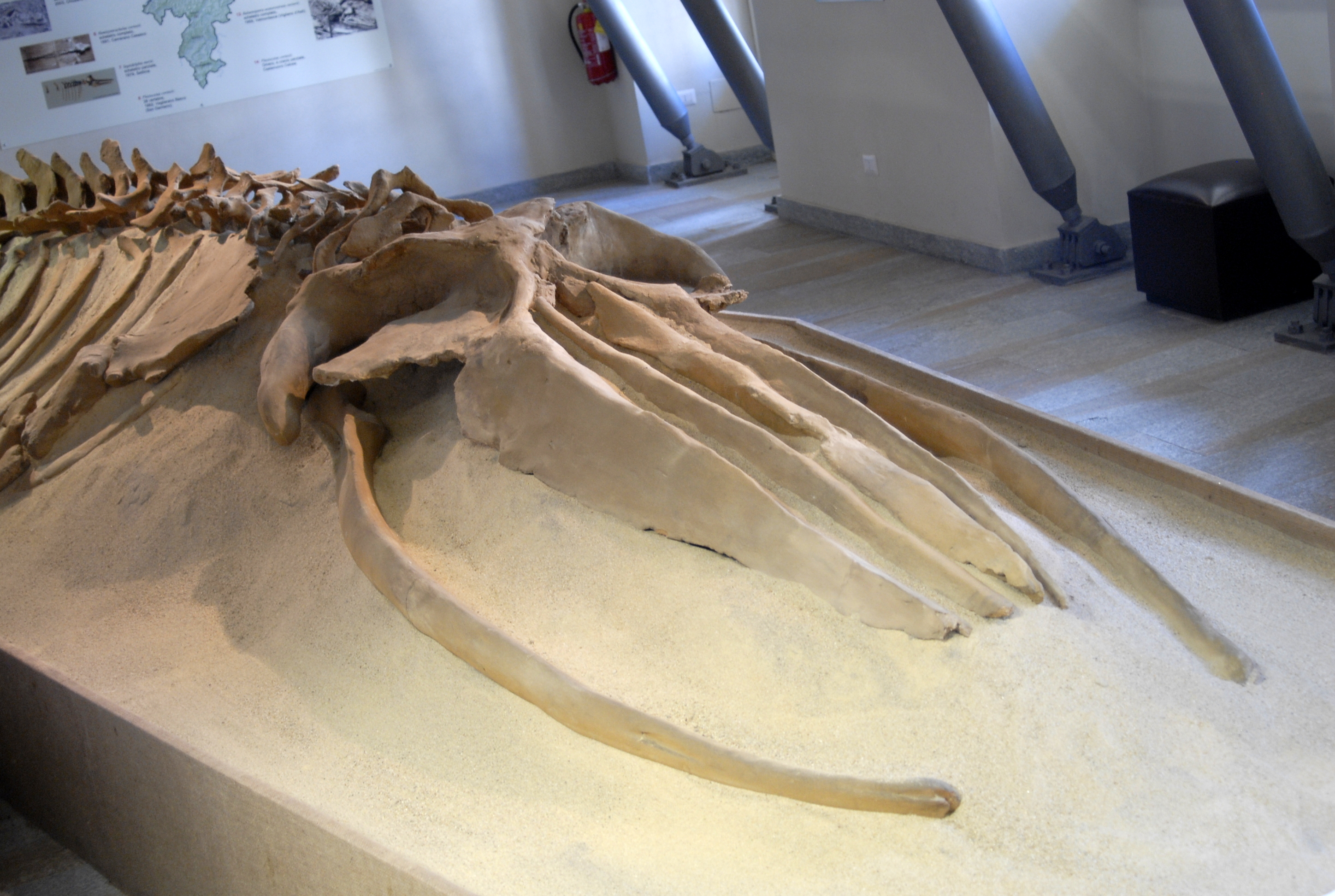
Fossil of Balaenoptera acutorostrata cuvieri from the Pliocene of Italy

== Taxonomy and systematics ==
The genus Balaenoptera contains the following extant species and subspecies:

- Common minke whale (Balaenoptera acutorostrata)
  - North Atlantic minke whale (Balaenoptera acutorostrata acutorostrata)
  - North Pacific minke whale (Balaenoptera acutorostrata scammoni)
- Antarctic minke whale (Balaenoptera bonaerensis)
- Sei whale (Balaenoptera borealis)
  - Northern sei whale (Balaenoptera borealis borealis)
  - Southern sei whale (Balaenoptera borealis schlegelii)
- Bryde's whale (Balaenoptera edeni)
  - Offshore Bryde's whale (Balaenoptera brydei or Balaenoptera edeni brydei) (taxonomy disputed)
  - Eden's whale (Balaenoptera edeni edeni)
- Blue whale (Balaenoptera musculus)
  - Northern blue whale (Balaenoptera musculus musculus)
  - Antarctic blue whale (Balaenoptera musculus intermedia)
  - Northern Indian Ocean blue whale (Balaenoptera musculus indica)
  - Pygmy blue whale (Balaenoptera musculus brevicauda)
- Omura's whale (Balaenoptera omurai)
- Fin whale (Balaenoptera physalus)
  - Pygmy fin whale (Balaenoptera physalus patachonica)
  - North Atlantic fin whale (Balaenoptera physalus physalus)
  - Southern fin whale (Balaenoptera physalus quoyi)
  - North Pacific fin whale (Balaenoptera physalus velifera)
- Rice's whale (Balaenoptera ricei)

=== Fossil species ===
Many fossil Balaenoptera species have been described. Some (namely B. borealina, B. definata, B. emarginata, B. gibbosa, B. rostratella, and B. sibbaldina) are either nondiagnostic, highly fragmentary, or had no holotype specimen named, hence are considered nomina dubia. The valid fossil species of Balaenoptera are:

- †Balaenoptera bertae is a relatively small species from the Upper Miocene to Upper Pliocene Purisima Formation of California.
- †Balaenoptera cephalus was originally thought to be a species of Eschrichtius (gray whales) or Cetotherium, but more recent analysis shows it to be a member of Balaenoptera. Fossils of the species were found in the Calvert Formation of Maryland.
- †Balaenoptera colcloughi is known from four specimens, including four skulls and some postcranial remains, found at the San Diego Formation. It was a close relative of Megaptera novaeangliae (the humpback whale), B. siberi, and B. physalus (the fin whale).
- †"Balaenoptera" cortesii is a small species based on a juvenile specimen from Montezago; it probably represents a distinct, unnamed genus of balaenopterid.
- †Balaenoptera davidsonii, like B. cephalus, was originally classified under Eschrichtius, but it has since been moved to Balaenoptera. It was native to the Pliocene San Diego Formation of California. The only known fossil of B. davidsonii is a fragment of the left dentary.
- †"Balaenoptera" portisi is based on MGPT 13803 from Montafia (originally assigned to B. cortesii by Portis [1885]), and may be the same genus or species as Cetotheriophanes capellinii. The species "B. floridana" is indistinguishable from "B." portisi.
- †"Balaenoptera" ryani is a valid species but is not in fact a species of Balaenoptera. It probably represents a distinct genus of basal balaenopterid.
- †Balaenoptera siberi is known from two complete skeletons. Its affinity with the genus Balaenoptera has been questioned.
- †Balaenoptera sursiplana is a fragmentary species, based on a single fossilized tympanic bone.
- †Balaenoptera taiwanica is named after Taiwan, where the fossil was found in the Pliocene-aged Cholan Formation. B. taiwanica is also based on a single tympanic bone, which is similar to that of B. physalus, the fin whale.
