= Parabalaenoptera =

Parabalaenoptera Temporal range: Late Miocene

Scientific classification
- Kingdom: Animalia
- Phylum: Chordata
- Class: Mammalia
- Order: Artiodactyla
- Infraorder: Cetacea
- Family: Balaenopteridae
- Genus: †Parabalaenoptera; Zeigler, 1997

Species
- P. baulinensis Zeigler, 1997 (type)

Extinct genus of mammals

Parabalaenoptera is an extinct genus of baleen whale found in Late Miocene sediments in Marin County, California. The type species is P. baulinensis. It was estimated to be about the size of the modern gray whale, about 16 metres (52 ft) long. Zeigler placed P. baulinensis in the subfamily Parabalaenopterinae in 1997, a clade which includes an extinct species of rorqual whales, also part of the Balaenopteridae family.
