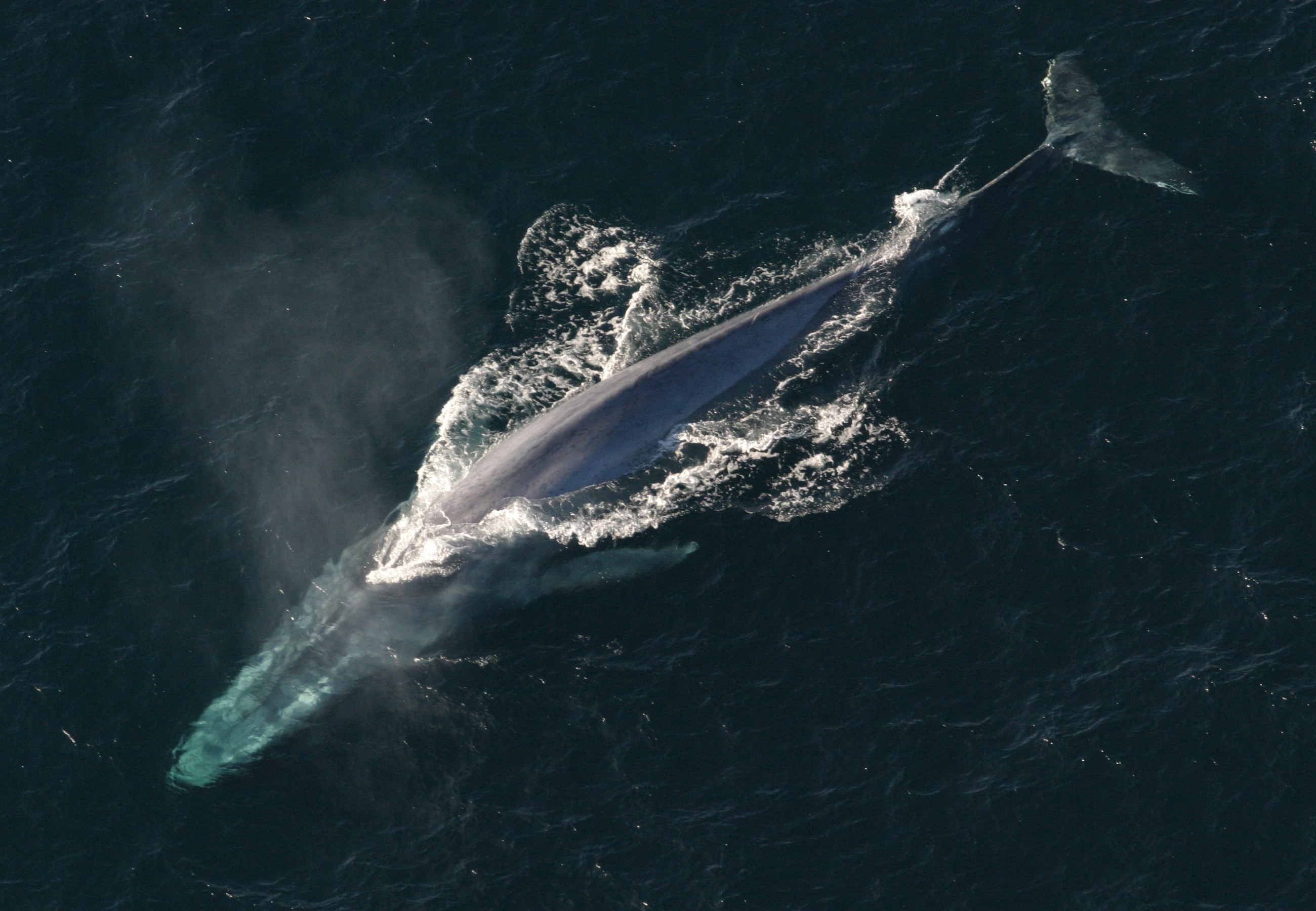
- Blue whale, Balaenoptera musculus

Scientific classification
- Kingdom: Animalia
- Phylum: Chordata
- Class: Mammalia
- Order: Artiodactyla
- Infraorder: Cetacea
- Parvorder: Mysticeti
- Superfamily: Balaenopteroidea
- Family: Balaenopteridae; Gray 1864

Type genus
- Balaenoptera Lacépède, 1804

Extant genera
- Balaenoptera; Megaptera
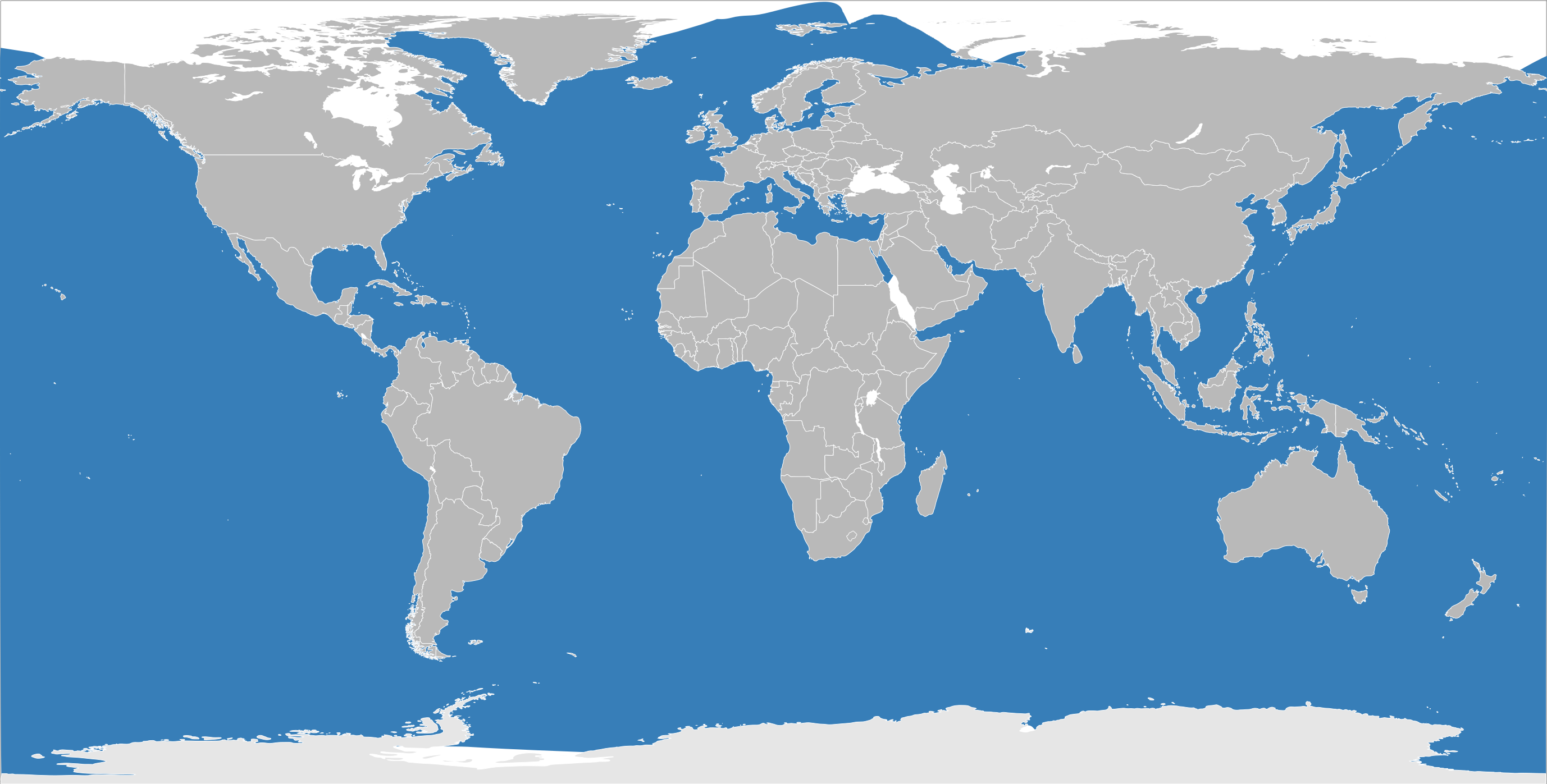
- Balaenopteridae distribution (in blue)

Synonyms
- Eschrichtiidae? Ellerman & Morrison-Scott 1951; Rhachianectidae Weber 1904

= Rorqual =

Rorquals Temporal range: Miocene–Recent

Family of cetacean mammals

Rorquals (/ˈrɔːrkwəlz/) are the largest group of baleen whales, comprising the family Balaenopteridae, which contains nine extant species in two genera. They include the largest animal ever known to have lived, the blue whale, which can reach 180 tonnes (200 short tons), and the fin whale, which reaches 120 tonnes (130 short tons); the smallest of the group, the northern minke whale, reaches 9 tonnes (10 short tons).

Rorquals take their name from French rorqual, which derives from the Norwegian word røyrkval: the first element røyr originated from the Old Norse name for this type of whale, reyðr, probably related to the Norse word, and the Icelandic word "reyr", for "reed", referring to the "Baleen hair" that is inside the mouth of these whales. The second element relates to the Norse word hvalr meaning "whale" in general. The family name Balaenopteridae is from the type genus, Balaenoptera.

== Characteristics ==
All members of the family have a series of longitudinal folds of skin running from below the mouth back to the navel (except the sei whale and common minke whale, which have shorter grooves). These furrows allow the mouth to expand immensely when feeding. These "pleated throat grooves" or "ventral pleats" distinguish balaenopterids from other whales.

Rorquals are slender and streamlined in shape, compared with their relatives the right whales, and most have narrow, elongated flippers. They have a dorsal fin, situated about two-thirds the way back. Most rorquals feed by gulping in water, and then pushing it out through the baleen plates with their tongue; the exception is the gray whale, which gulps in and filters large amounts of marine sediments from the seafloor. They feed on crustaceans, such as krill, but also on various fish, such as herrings and sardines.

Gestation in rorquals lasts 11–12 months, so that both mating and birthing occur at the same time of year. Cows give birth to a single calf, which is weaned after 6–12 months, depending on species. Of some species, adults live in small groups, or "pods" of two to five individuals. For example, humpback whales have a fluid social structure, often engaging behavioral practices in a pod, other times being solitary.

== Distribution and habitat ==
Distribution is worldwide: the blue, fin, humpback, and the sei whales are found in all major oceans; the common (northern) and Antarctic (southern) minke whale species are found in all the oceans of their respective hemispheres; either of Bryde's whale and Eden's whale occur in the Atlantic, Pacific, and Indian oceans, being absent only from the cold waters of the Arctic and Antarctic; and the gray whale is found in the northern Pacific Ocean, although it was also found in the Atlantic Ocean in historic times. Rice's whale has the smallest distribution of rorquals and possibly baleen whales in general, being endemic to a small portion of the Gulf of Mexico west of the Florida peninsula and south of Alabama and the Florida panhandle, although it likely formerly had a much wider distribution in the Gulf.

Most rorquals are strictly oceanic: the exceptions are the gray whale, Bryde's whale, Eden's whale, and Rice's whale (which are usually found close to shore all year round) and the humpback whale (which is oceanic but passes close to shore when migrating). It is the largest and the smallest types — the blue whale and Antarctic minke whale — that occupy the coldest waters in the extreme south; the fin whale tends not to approach so close to the ice shelf; the sei whale tends to stay further north again. (In the northern hemisphere, where the continents distort weather patterns and ocean currents, these movements are less obvious, although still present.) Within each species, the largest individuals tend to approach the poles more closely, while the youngest and fittest ones tend to stay in warmer waters before leaving on their annual migration.

Most rorquals breed in tropical waters during the winter, then migrate back to the polar feeding grounds rich in plankton and krill for the short polar summer.

== Feeding habits ==
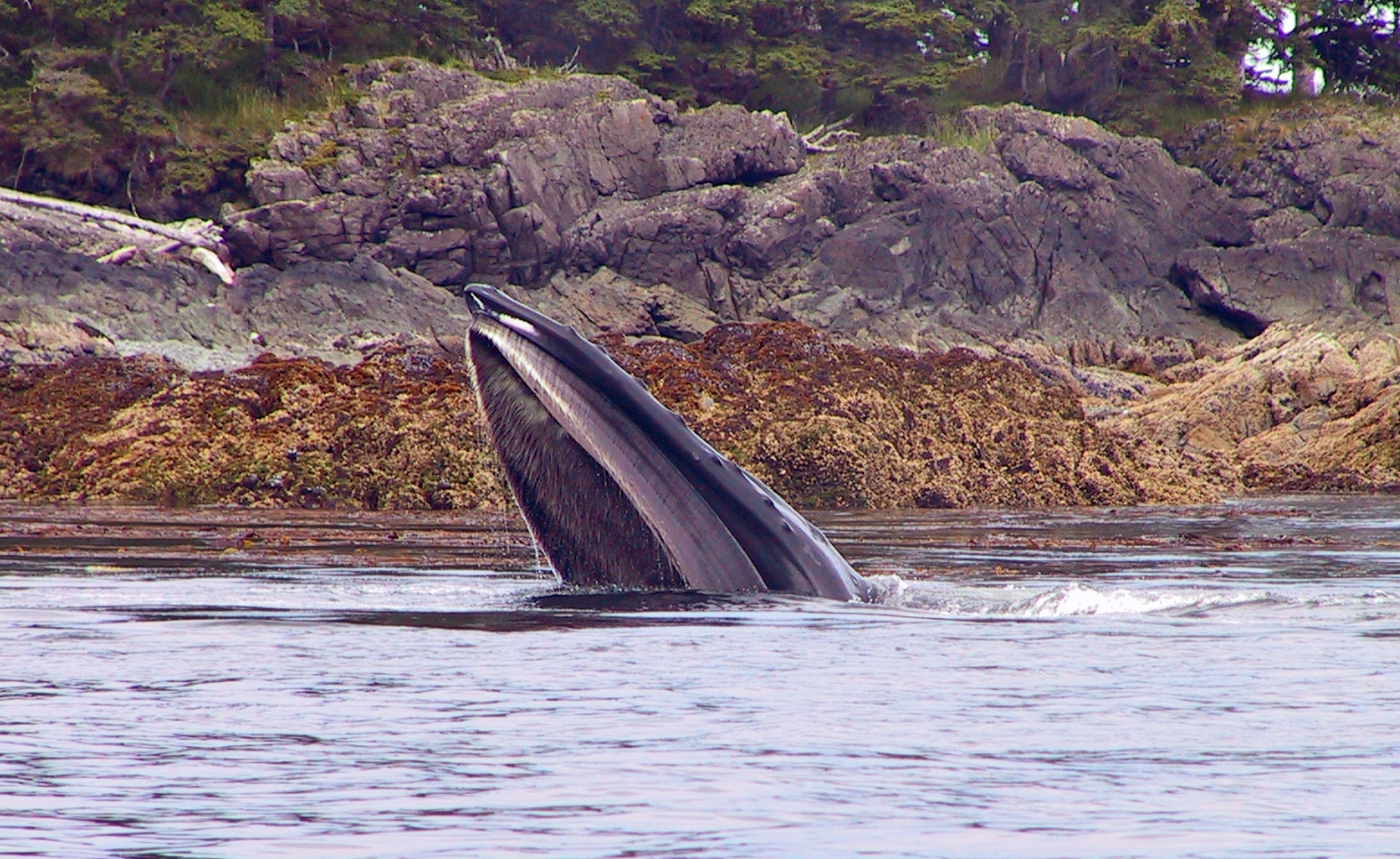
Humpback feeding on young pollock off Alaska

As well as other methods, rorquals obtain prey by lunge-feeding on bait balls. Lunge feeding is an extreme feeding method, where the whale accelerates to a high velocity and then opens its mouth to a large gape angle. This generates the water pressure required to expand its mouth and engulf and filter a huge amount of water and fish. In contrast to typical lunge feeding, Gray whales employ a unique suction feeding strategy to capture prey near or on the sea bottom.

Rorquals have a number of anatomical features that enable them to do this, including bilaterally separate mandibles, throat pleats that can expand to huge size, and a unique sensory organ consisting of a bundle of mechanoreceptors that helps their brains to coordinate the engulfment action. Furthermore, their large nerves are flexible so that they can stretch and recoil. In fact, they give rorquals the ability to open their mouths so wide that they would be capable of taking in water at volumes greater than their own sizes. These nerves are packed into a central core area that is surrounded by elastin fibers. Opening the mouth causes the nerves to unfold, and they snap back after the mouth is closed. According to Potvin and Goldbogen, lunge feeding in rorquals represents the largest biomechanical event on Earth.

== Taxonomy ==
Cladogram of the family Balaenopteridae using complete mtDNA sequences and short interspersed repetitive element (SINE) insertion data.

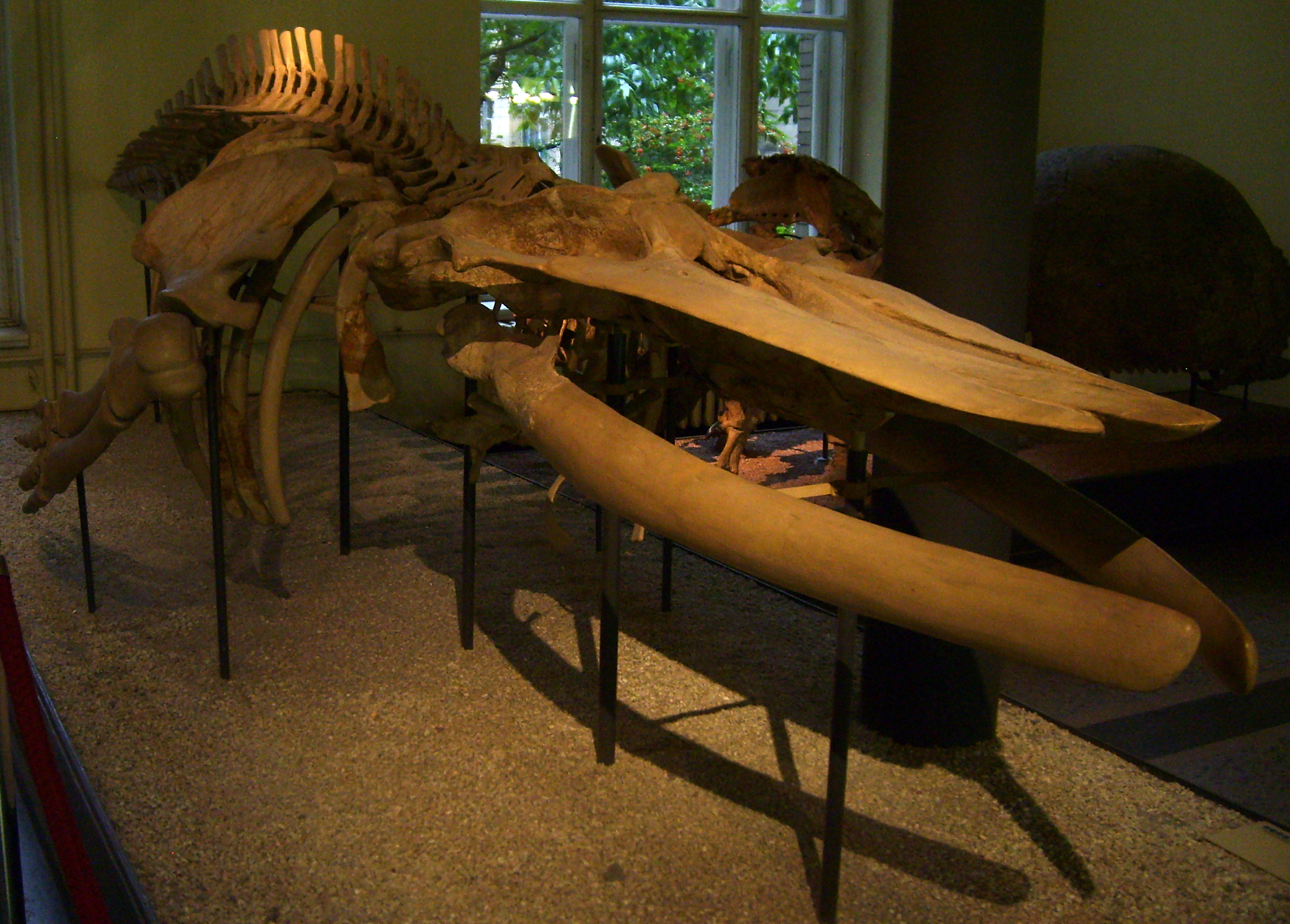
Skeleton of the extinct Plesiobalaenoptera hubachi at the Museum für Naturkunde, Berlin

Formerly, the rorqual family Balaenopteridae was split into two subfamilies, the Balaenopterinae and the Megapterinae, with each subfamily containing one genus, Balaenoptera and Megaptera, respectively. However, the phylogeny of the various rorqual species shows the current division is paraphyletic, and in 2005, the division into subfamilies was dropped. Two genetic studies, one in 2018 and one in 2020, suggest that the gray whale (Eschrichtius robustus) be counted among the rorquals, being more derived than the two minke whales but basal to the humpback whale, fin whale, and the other taxa classified in Balaenoptera.

The discovery of a new species of balaenopterid, Omura's whale (Balaenoptera omurai), was announced in November 2003, which looks similar to, but smaller than, the fin whale; individuals of this species were found in Indo-Pacific waters. The discovery of the highly endangered Rice's whale was announced in 2021 after a genetic study found it to be distinct from Bryde's whale; this species is known from a small portion of the northeastern Gulf of Mexico.

=== Extant species ===
- Family Balaenopteridae: Rorquals
  - Balaenoptera
    - Fin whale, Balaenoptera physalus
      - Northern fin whale, Balaenoptera physalus physalus
      - Southern fin whale, Balaenoptera physalus quoyi
    - Sei whale, Balaenoptera borealis
    - Bryde's whale, Balaenoptera edeni
      - Eden's whale, Balaenoptera edeni edeni
    - Rice's whale, Balaenoptera ricei
    - Blue whale, Balaenoptera musculus
      - Pygmy blue whale, Balaenoptera musculus brevicauda
    - Common minke whale, Balaenoptera acutorostrata
    - Antarctic minke whale, Balaenoptera bonaerensis
    - Omura's whale, Balaenoptera omurai
  - Megaptera
    - Humpback whale, Megaptera novaeangliae

=== Fossil genera ===
  - †Archaebalaenoptera
  - †Archaeschrichtius
  - †Cetotheriophanes
  - †Diunatans
  - †Eschrichtioides
  - †Gricetoides
  - †Incakujira
  - †Miobalaenoptera
  - †Nehalaennia
  - †Parabalaenoptera
  - †Plesiobalaenoptera
  - †Plesiocetus
  - †Praemegaptera
  - †Protororqualus
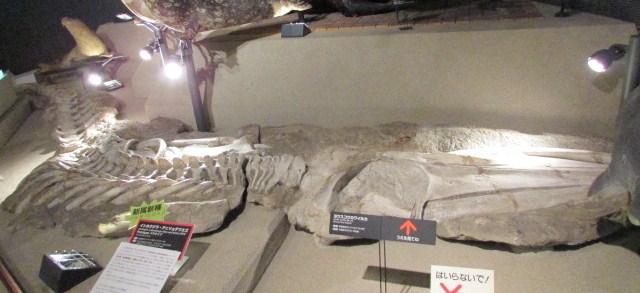
    Incakujira anilliodefuego paratype

=== Alternative generic taxonomy for living rorquals ===
In 2012, the following alternate taxonomy was presented:

- Balaenoptera
  - Fin whale, Balaenoptera physalus
- Megaptera
  - Humpback whale, Megaptera novaeangliae
- Pterobalaena
  - Common minke whale, Pterobalaena acutorostrata
  - Antarctic minke whale, Pterobalaena bonaerensis
- Rorqualus
  - Sei whale, Rorqualus borealis
  - Bryde's whale, Rorqualus brydei
  - Eden's whale, Rorqualus edeni
  - Blue whale, Rorqualus musculus
  - Omura's whale, Rorqualus omurai
