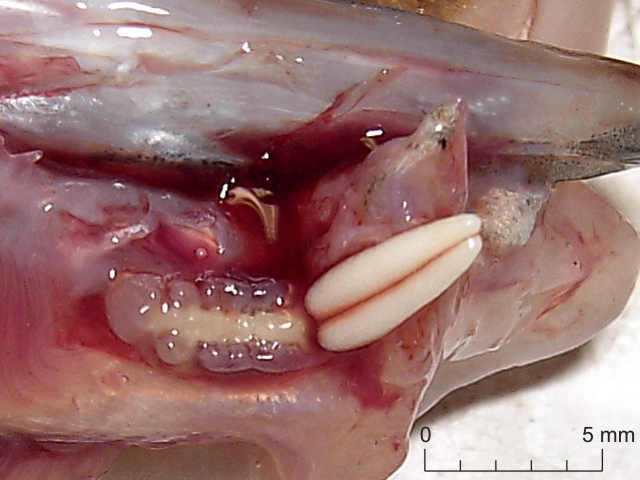
- Female Acanthochondria limandae attached to Limanda limanda. The two white cylindrical objects are its egg sacs.

Scientific classification
- Kingdom: Animalia
- Phylum: Arthropoda
- Clade: Pancrustacea
- Class: Copepoda
- Order: Cyclopoida
- Family: Chondracanthidae
- Genus: Acanthochondria
- Species: A. limandae

Binomial name
- Acanthochondria limandae (Krøyer, 1863)

Synonyms
- Chondracanthus limandae Krøyer, 1863

= Acanthochondria limandae =

Species of crustacean

Acanthochondria limandae is a species of copepods in the family Chondracanthidae. They are host-specific ectoparasites of two species of flatfish: the common dab (Limanda limanda) and the European flounder (Platichthys flesus). They attach themselves to the bases of the gill arches of their hosts. They can infest as much as 2 to 30% of fish in a given population.

Acanthochondria limandae was first described by the Danish zoologist Henrik Nikolai Krøyer in 1863 as Chondracanthus limandae.
