= Pennella exocoeti =

Scientific classification
- Domain: Eukaryota
- Kingdom: Animalia
- Phylum: Arthropoda
- Class: Copepoda
- Order: Siphonostomatoida
- Family: Pennellidae
- Genus: Pennella
- Species: P. exocoeti

Binomial name
- Pennella exocoeti (Holten, 1802)

Synonyms
- Lernaea exocoeti Holten, 1802; Lernaeopenna holteni Desmarest, 1825; Pennella blainvillei (Le Sueur, 1824); Pennella holteni (Desmarest, 1825); Pennella liouvillei Quidor, 1913

Species of crustacean

Pennella exocoeti is a large ectoparasitic copepod, a specialist parasite of flying fish. The adult female copepod clings to the fish's gills or skin and feeds on its body fluids.

== Taxonomy ==
Pennella exocoeti was first described by the Danish zoologist Hans Severin Holten in 1802 from a specimen probably found on the mirrorwing flyingfish (Hirundichthys speculiger). He called it a "gill worm" and recognised that it had close affinities with Chondracanthus merluccii, another "gill worm" found on a member of the cod family Gadidae, but he did not realise they were both copepods. Another species was described by the French naturalist Charles Alexandre Lesueur as Pennella blainvilli from the tropical two-wing flyingfish (Exocoetus volitans), but that has since been determined to be a synonym of P. exocoeti.

== Description ==
This is a large copepod that may grow to a length of 20 cm (8 in). The mature female found attached to its host bears little resemblance to a free-living copepod. The mouthparts are adapted for piercing the host's cuticle and sucking fluids, the second antennae are modified with hooked claws for gripping the host, and the other appendages are vestigial. The body gradually widens towards the posterior and has transverse bands of dark colour. The body terminates with an egg sac and a pair of very long setae (bristles).

== Ecology ==
The adult female copepod is parasitic while the adult male is free-living. The head and neck of the female burrow into the host fish and large, hard cysts are formed in the host's organs. The attachment is made by hooking to the fish with the prehensile second antennae, the remaining parts of the copepod's body hanging free.

This copepod is in its turn often parasitised by a goose barnacle, Conchoderma virgatum.
