= Pennella balaenopterae =

Scientific classification
- Kingdom: Animalia
- Phylum: Arthropoda
- Clade: Pancrustacea
- Class: Copepoda
- Order: Siphonostomatoida
- Family: Pennellidae
- Genus: Pennella
- Species: P. balaenopterae

Binomial name
- Pennella balaenopterae Koren & Danielssen, 1877

Synonyms
- Pennella antarctica Quidor, 1913; Pennella anthonyi Quidor, 1913; Pennella cettei Quidor, 1913; Pennella charcoti Quidor, 1913

Species of crustacean

Pennella balaenopterae is a large ectoparasitic copepod specialising in parasitising marine mammals. It is the largest member of the genus Pennella, the other species of which are parasites of larger marine fish.

== Description ==
P. balaenopterae is one of the largest species of copepods within the family Pennellidae, reaching up to 30 centimetres (12 in) in length. The adult females are characterised by a loss of external segmentation and absorption of swimming legs. Pennella species are recognised by the branched outgrowths on the posterior part of their abdomens. The mandibles form a sucking tube for the mouth through which the species feed and adults also have a pair of segmented sensory antennae. Five pairs of thoracic legs are found in the species, which are more modified in females than males. After attaching to the host the parasite undergoes diphasic growth. The first phase of this type of growth occurs in the copepod's anterior body portion. During the second phase of growth, the posterior portion which is where the reproductive organs are, begins to grow extremely rapidly, and is soon larger than the anterior portion.

== Distribution ==
P. balaenopterae is found around Antarctica, and in western and northern parts of the Pacific Ocean. It has also been recorded from the Mediterranean Sea.

== Biology ==
The sei whale (Balaenoptera borealis) and the minke whale (Balaenoptera acutorostrata) are the main hosts of P. balaenopterae. Most species of Pennella have intermediate hosts which are important for the life cycle of the species, but the intermediate host of Pennella balaenopterae is not known. There have been recent records of this species parasitising pinnipeds, namely a northern elephant seal (Mirounga angustirostris) in the north Pacific and from fin whale (Balaenoptera physalus), Cuvier's beaked whale (Ziphius cavirostris), Risso's dolphin (Grampus griseus), the bottlenose dolphin (Tursiops truncatus) in the Adriatic Sea and harbour porpoise Phocoena phocoena relicta in the Aegean Sea. The early development of the larvae takes place in the egg sac while it is still attached to the female until it is released into the water column possessing a full set of cephalic appendages and three pairs of thoracic legs. The larval form then finds an intermediate host where it remains and develops into the copepodid stages. After development of the attachment mouthparts, the female copepod finds its definitive host where it then permanently attaches. Females can produce from 300 to 700 eggs in each of her paired egg sacs while engorged and attached to her definitive host. Males remain as free swimming copepodids but the females have a distinctive anchoring processes that extend from its anterior end. After both sexes have reached full sexual maturity copulation occurs, after which the male dies. The female then loses all external segmentation and grows drastically in size. Both temperature and salinity are important factors to ensure successful reproduction.
