= Chondracanthus =

Chondracanthus may refer to:

- Chondracanthus (alga), an alga genus in the family Gigartinaceae
- Chondracanthus (crustacean), a copepod genus in the family Chondracanthidae
