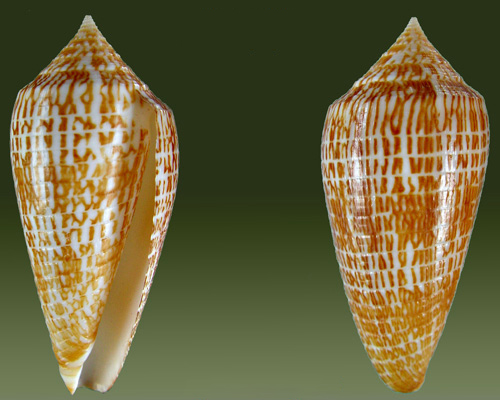
- Apertural and abapertural views of shell of Conus armadillo Shikama, T., 1971
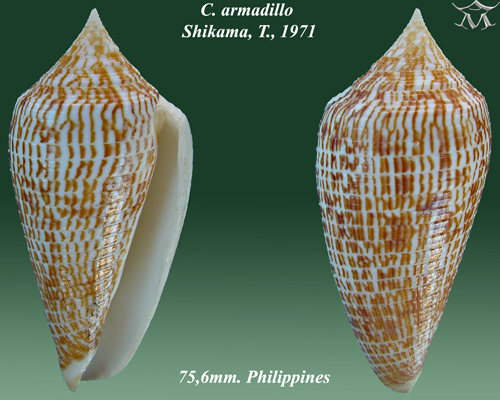

Conservation status
- Least Concern (IUCN 3.1)

Scientific classification
- Kingdom: Animalia
- Phylum: Mollusca
- Class: Gastropoda
- Subclass: Caenogastropoda
- Order: Neogastropoda
- Superfamily: Conoidea
- Family: Conidae
- Genus: Conus
- Species: C. armadillo

Binomial name
- Conus armadillo Shikama, 1971

Synonyms
- Asprella armadillo (Shikama, 1971); Conus (Phasmoconus) armadillo Shikama, 1971· accepted, alternate representation; Graphiconus armadillo (Shikama, 1971)

= Conus armadillo =

Species of sea snail

Conus armadillo is a species of sea snail, a marine gastropod mollusk in the family Conidae, the cone snails and their allies.

Like all species within the genus Conus, these snails are predatory and venomous. They are capable of stinging humans, therefore live ones should be handled carefully or not at all.

The subspecies Conus armadillo gabryae L. Raybaudi, 1989 is a synonym of Conus gabryae Röckel & Korn, 1992 in turn a synonym of Conus australis Holten, 1802

== Description ==
The size of the shell varies between 60 mm and 79 mm.

== Distribution ==
This marine species occurs off Taiwan, the Philippines; Queensland, Australia; Papua New Guinea, and the Loyalty Islands.
