= Chondracanthus merluccii =

Scientific classification
- Kingdom: Animalia
- Phylum: Arthropoda
- Clade: Pancrustacea
- Class: Copepoda
- Order: Cyclopoida
- Family: Chondracanthidae
- Genus: Chondracanthus
- Species: C. merluccii

Binomial name
- Chondracanthus merluccii (Holten, 1802)

Synonyms
- Chondracanthus merlangi (Holten, 1802); Chondracanthus stramineus Wilson C.B., 1923; Chondracanthus xiphiae Cuvier, 1829; Lernaea merlangi Holten, 1802; Lernaea merluccii Holten, 1802

Species of crustacean

Chondracanthus merluccii is a species of copepod in the family Chondracanthidae. It is a host-specific ectoparasite of the European hake (Merluccius merluccius). It was first described in 1802 by the Danish zoologist Hans Severin Holten who named it Lernaea merluccii.

== Ecology ==
Both adult females and adult males cling onto the lining of the floor of the mouth and onto the gills of the host fish.
