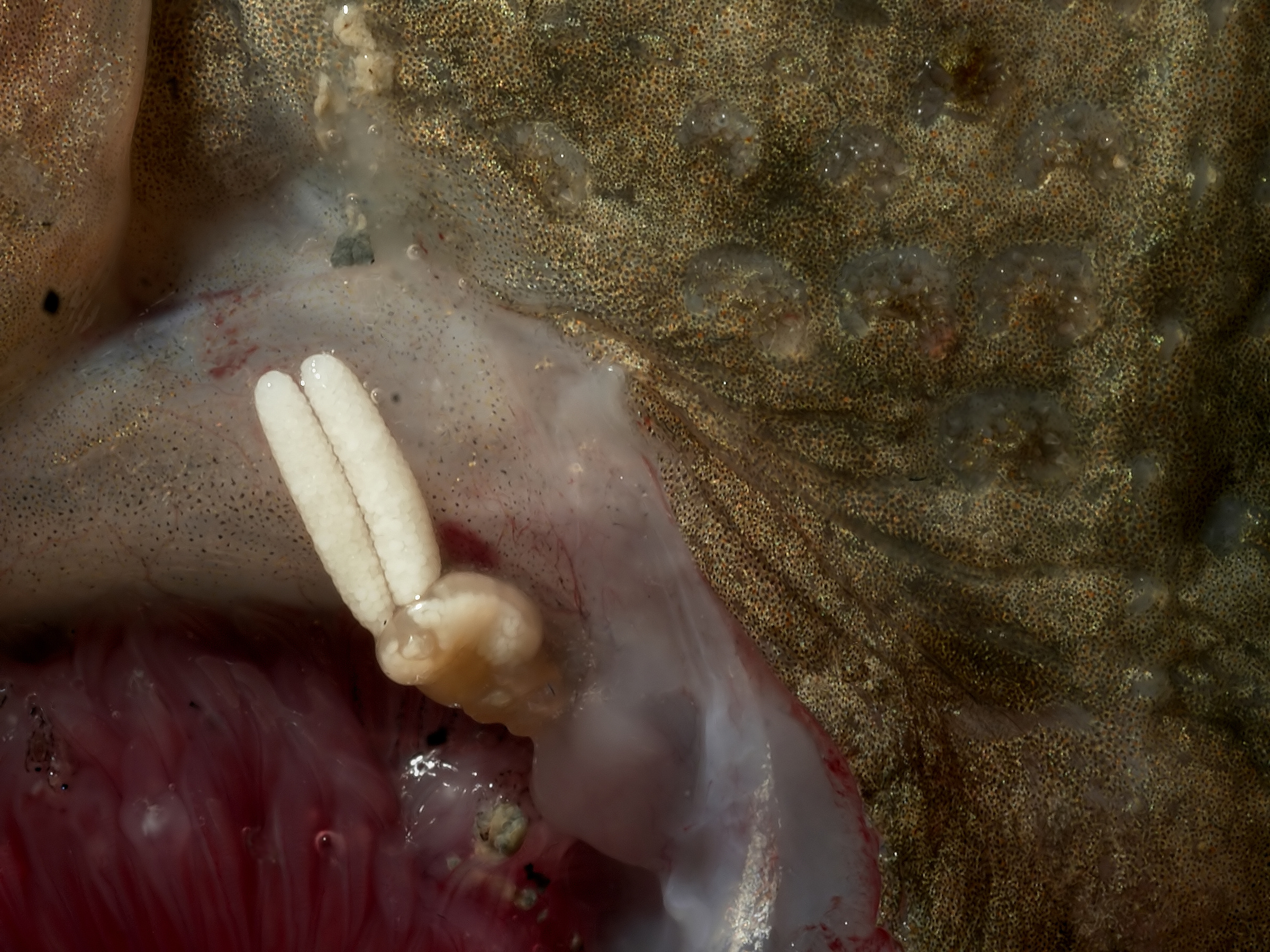

Scientific classification
- Kingdom: Animalia
- Phylum: Arthropoda
- Class: Copepoda
- Order: Cyclopoida
- Family: Chondracanthidae
- Genus: Acanthochondria
- Species: A. cornuta

Binomial name
- Acanthochondria cornuta (O. F. Müller, 1776)

Synonyms
- Acanthochondria depressa (Scott T., 1905); Acanthochondria flurae (Krøyer, 1863); Anops cornuta Müller O.F., 1776; Chondracanthus cornutus (Müller O.F., 1776); Chondracanthus depressus Scott T., 1905; Chondracanthus flurae Krøyer, 1863; Entomoda cornuta (Müller O.F., 1776); Lernaea cornuta Müller O.F., 1776; Lernentoma cornuta (Müller O.F., 1776)

= Acanthochondria cornuta =

Species of parasitic copepod

Acanthochondria cornuta is a species of parasitic copepod from the northeast Atlantic Ocean, and the type species of the genus Acanthochondria. It infects the gills of several species of flatfish, particularly the European flounder (Platichthys flesus). Copepodids and immature females infect the holobranch of the host, while adult females prefer the pseudobranch and the internal wall, suggesting they migrate upstream in the gills of the host as they mature.

== Reproduction ==
Males in this species are several times smaller than the females, and attach themselves permanently onto special 'nuptial organs' on their mates. These organs are paired, and therefore a single female can sometimes hold two males. In Portuguese waters, reproduction occurs year-round, and two generations are produced annually: a summer-autumn generation and a winter-spring generation. Females of the former are smaller and produce less eggs, while those of the latter are larger and more fecund but produce smaller eggs.

== See also ==
- Fish diseases and parasites
