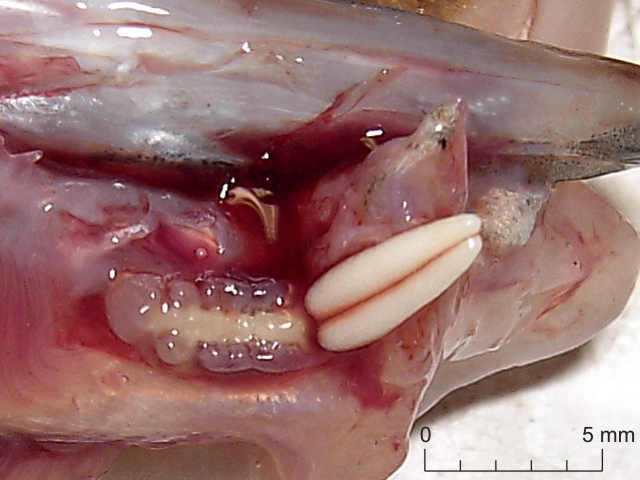
- Female A. limandae attached to Limanda limanda. The two white cylindrical objects are its egg sacs.

Scientific classification
- Kingdom: Animalia
- Phylum: Arthropoda
- Clade: Pancrustacea
- Class: Copepoda
- Order: Cyclopoida
- Family: Chondracanthidae
- Genus: Acanthochondria; Oakley, 1930

= Acanthochondria =

Genus of crustaceans

Acanthochondria is a genus of copepods, containing the following species:

- Acanthochondria alatalongicollis Heegaard, 1940
- Acanthochondria alleni Tang, Kalman & Ho, 2010
- Acanthochondria bicornis Shiino, 1955
- Acanthochondria brevicorpa Yü, 1935
- Acanthochondria clavata (Bassett-Smith, 1896)
- Acanthochondria constricta Shiino, 1955
- Acanthochondria cornuta (O. F. Müller, 1776)
- Acanthochondria cyclopsetta Pearse, 1952
- Acanthochondria dilatata Shiino, 1955
- Acanthochondria dojirii Kabata, 1984
- Acanthochondria elongata (Bassett-Smith, 1898)
- Acanthochondria epachthes (C. B. Wilson, 1908)
- Acanthochondria eptatreti (Chen, Luo, Dai & Shih, 2014)
- Acanthochondria exilipes C. B. Wilson, 1932
- Acanthochondria fissicauda Shiino, 1955
- Acanthochondria fraseri Ho, 1972
- Acanthochondria galerita (Rathbun, 1886)
- Acanthochondria glandiceps Shiino, 1955
- Acanthochondria helicoleni Cantatore & Timi, 2010
- Acanthochondria hippoglossi Kabata, 1987
- Acanthochondria hoi Kalman, 2003
- Acanthochondria incisa Shiino, 1955
- Acanthochondria inimici Yamaguti, 1939
- Acanthochondria kajika Ho & I. H. Kim, 1996
- Acanthochondria laemonemae Capart, 1959
- Acanthochondria lepidionis Barnard, 1955
- Acanthochondria lilianae Cantatore, Lanfranchi & Timi, 2011
- Acanthochondria limandae (Krøyer, 1863)
- Acanthochondria longifrons Shiino, 1955
- Acanthochondria macrocephala Gusev, 1951
- Acanthochondria margolisi Kabata, 1984
- Acanthochondria ophidii (Krøyer, 1863)
- Acanthochondria oralis Yamaguti, 1939
- Acanthochondria phycidis (Rathbun, 1886)
- Acanthochondria pingi (Yü & Wu, 1932)
- Acanthochondria platycephali Heegaard, 1940
- Acanthochondria priacanthi Shiino, 1964
- Acanthochondria rectangularis (Fraser, 1920)
- Acanthochondria sagitta Alarcos & Timi, 2011
- Acanthochondria shawi Yü, 1935
- Acanthochondria sicyasis (Krøyer, 1863)
- Acanthochondria sixteni (C. B. Wilson, 1922)
- Acanthochondria soleae (Krøyer, 1838)
- Acanthochondria spirigera Shiino, 1955
- Acanthochondria tasmaniae Heegaard, 1962
- Acanthochondria tchangi Yü, 1935
- Acanthochondria triangularis Alves, Luque & Paraguassu, 2003
- Acanthochondria triglae Herrera-Cubilla & Raibaut, 1990
- Acanthochondria uranoscopi Ho & I. H. Kim, 1995
- Acanthochondria vancouverensis Kabata, 1984
- Acanthochondria yui Shiino, 1964

Several species inquirendae are also assigned to the genus:

- Acanthochondria argutula (Markevich, 1940)
- Acanthochondria ateleopi Capart, 1959
- Acanthochondria barnardi Capart, 1959
- Acanthochondria briani (Yü & Wu, 1932)
- Acanthochondria compacta Markevich, 1956
- Acanthochondria grandigenitalis (Yü & Wu, 1932)
- Acanthochondria spinulosa Capart, 1959
- Acanthochondria wui Yü, 1935
