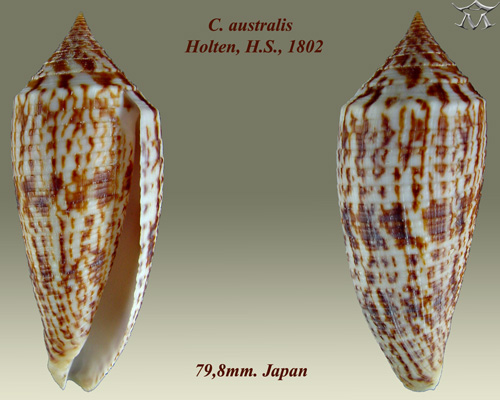
- Apertural and abapertural views of shell of Conus australis Holten, H.S., 1802
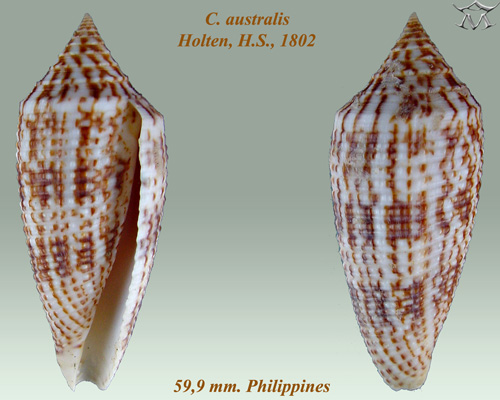

Conservation status
- Least Concern (IUCN 3.1)

Scientific classification
- Kingdom: Animalia
- Phylum: Mollusca
- Class: Gastropoda
- Subclass: Caenogastropoda
- Order: Neogastropoda
- Superfamily: Conoidea
- Family: Conidae
- Genus: Conus
- Species: C. australis

Binomial name
- Conus australis (Holten, 1802)

Synonyms
- Asprella alabasteroides Shikama, 1963; Asprella australis Holten, 1802; Conus armadillo gabryae L. Raybaudi, 1989; Conus australis Lamarck, 1810; Conus cebuganus da Motta & Martin, 1982; Conus duplicatus G. B. Sowerby I, 1823; Conus gabryae Röckel & Korn, 1992; Conus gracilis G.B. Sowerby I, 1823; Conus patamakanthini Delsaerdt, 1998; Conus strigatus Hwass in Bruguière, 1792 (identity doubtful; treated by some authors as a ); Conus (Phasmoconus) australis Holten, 1802 · accepted, alternate representation; Graphiconus australis (Holten, 1802)

= Conus australis =

Species of sea snail

Conus australis, common name the austral cone, is a species of sea snail, a marine gastropod mollusk in the family Conidae, the cone snails and their allies.

Like all species within the genus Conus, these snails are predatory and venomous. They are capable of stinging humans, therefore live ones should be handled carefully or not at all.

== Description ==
The size of the shell varies between 40 mm and 123 mm. The shell is distantly channeled throughout. The interstices are usually plane, sometimes minutely granular. The channels are narrow and longitudinally striated. The spire is much elevated, acuminated, striate, sometimes obscurely minutely coronated. The color of the shell is yellowish brown, with light chestnut longitudinal short irregular lines, and clouds of the same color forming three obscure interrupted bands.

== Distribution ==
This marine species occurs off Japan and in the South China Sea; also off New Caledonia and the Philippines.
