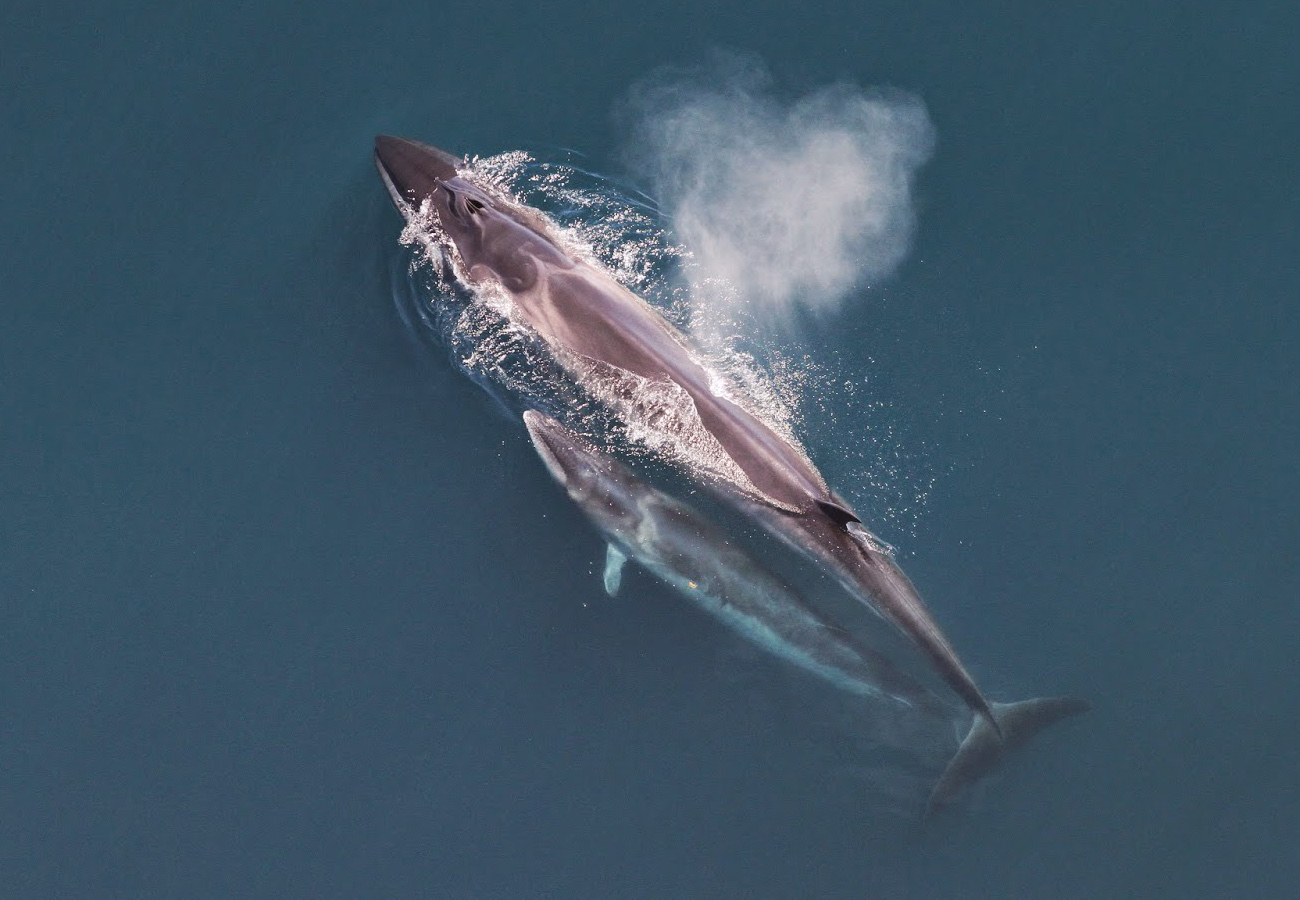
- Sei whale mother and calf
- Size compared to an average human

Conservation status
- Endangered (IUCN 3.1)

- Secure (NatureServe)
- CITES Appendix I

Scientific classification
- Kingdom: Animalia
- Phylum: Chordata
- Class: Mammalia
- Order: Artiodactyla
- Infraorder: Cetacea
- Family: Balaenopteridae
- Genus: Balaenoptera
- Species: B. borealis

Binomial name
- Balaenoptera borealis Lesson, 1828

Subspecies
- B.b.borealis; B.b.schlegelii
- Sei whale range

Synonyms
- Balaena rostrata (Rudolphi, 1822); Balaenoptera laticeps (Gray, 1846); Sibbaldius schlegelii (Flower, 1865); Rudolphius laticeps (Gray, 1868)

= Sei whale =

Species of baleen whale

The sei whale (/seɪ/ SAY; Balaenoptera borealis) is a baleen whale. It is one of ten rorqual species, and the third-largest member after the blue and fin whales. It can grow to 19.5 m (64 ft) in length and weigh as much as 28 t (28 long tons; 31 short tons). Two subspecies are recognized: B. b. borealis and B. b. schlegelii. The whale's ventral surface has sporadic markings ranging from light grey to white, and its body is usually dark steel grey in colour. It is among the fastest of all cetaceans, and can reach speeds of up to 50–55 km/h (31–34 mph) over short distances.

It inhabits most oceans and adjoining seas, and prefers deep offshore waters. It avoids polar and tropical waters and semi-enclosed bodies of water. The sei whale migrates annually from cool, subpolar waters in summer to temperate, subtropical waters in winter with a lifespan of 70 years. It is a filter feeder, with its diet consisting primarily of copepods, krill, and other zooplankton. It is typically solitary or can be found in groups numbering half a dozen. During the breeding period, a mating pair will remain together. Sei whale vocalizations usually last approximately half a second, and occur at 240–625 hertz.

Following large-scale commercial whaling during the late 19th and 20th centuries, when over 255,000 whales were killed, the sei whale is now internationally protected. It is listed as endangered on the IUCN Red List, though populations are increasing. The Northern Hemisphere population is listed under CITES Appendix II, which indicates they are not threatened with extinction, while the Southern Hemisphere population is listed under CITES Appendix I, indicating that they are threatened and are given the highest levels of protection.

== Etymology ==
"Sei whale" is an anglicization of the Norwegian seihval, meaning "pollock whale". The species was so called because it "appeared off the coast of Norway at the same time each year as the pollock that came to feed on the abundant plankton". In the Pacific, the whale has been called the Japan finner; "finner" was a common term used to refer to rorquals. It has also been referred to as the lesser fin whale because it somewhat resembles the fin whale.

== Taxonomy ==
On 21 February 1819, Swedish-born German naturalist Karl Rudolphi initially identified a 9.8 m (32 ft) whale stranded near Grömitz, in Schleswig-Holstein, as Balaena rostrata (Balaenoptera acutorostrata). In 1823, the French naturalist Georges Cuvier described Rudolphi's specimen under the name "rorqual du Nord". In 1828, Rene Lesson translated this term into Balaenoptera borealis, basing his designation partly on Cuvier's description of Rudolphi's specimen and partly on a 16 m (52 ft) female that had stranded on the coast of France the previous year (this was later identified as a juvenile fin whale, Balaenoptera physalus). In 1846, the English zoologist John Edward Gray, ignoring Lesson's designation, named Rudolphi's specimen Balaenoptera laticeps, which others followed. In 1865, British zoologist William Henry Flower named a 14 m (46 ft) specimen that had been obtained from Pekalongan, on the north coast of Java, Sibbaldius (Balaenoptera) schlegelii—in 1946 the Russian scientist A.G. Tomilin synonymized S. schlegelii and B. borealis, creating the subspecies B. b. schlegelii and B. b. borealis. In 1884–85, the Norwegian scientist G. A. Guldberg first identified the sejhval of Finnmark with B. borealis.

- Balaenopteridae
  - Minke whale
  - - - B. musculus (blue whale)
      - B. borealis (sei whale)
    - - Eschrichtius robustus (gray whale)
      - - B. physalus (fin whale)
        - Megaptera novaeangliae (humpback whale)

A phylogenetic tree of six baleen whale species

Sei whales are rorquals (family Balaenopteridae), baleen whales that include the humpback whale, the blue whale, Bryde's whale, the fin whale, and the minke whale. Rorquals take their name from the Norwegian word røyrkval, meaning "furrow whale", because family members have a series of longitudinal pleats or grooves on the anterior half of their ventral surface. Balaenopterids diverged from the other families of suborder Mysticeti, also called the whalebone whales, as long ago as the middle Miocene. Little is known about when members of the various families in the Mysticeti, including the Balaenopteridae, diverged from each other. Whole genome sequencing suggests that sei and blue whales are closely related, with gray whales as a sister group. This study also found significant gene flow between minke whales and the ancestors of the blue and sei whale.

Two subspecies have been identified—the northern sei whale (B. b. borealis) and southern sei whale (B. b. schlegelii).

== Description ==
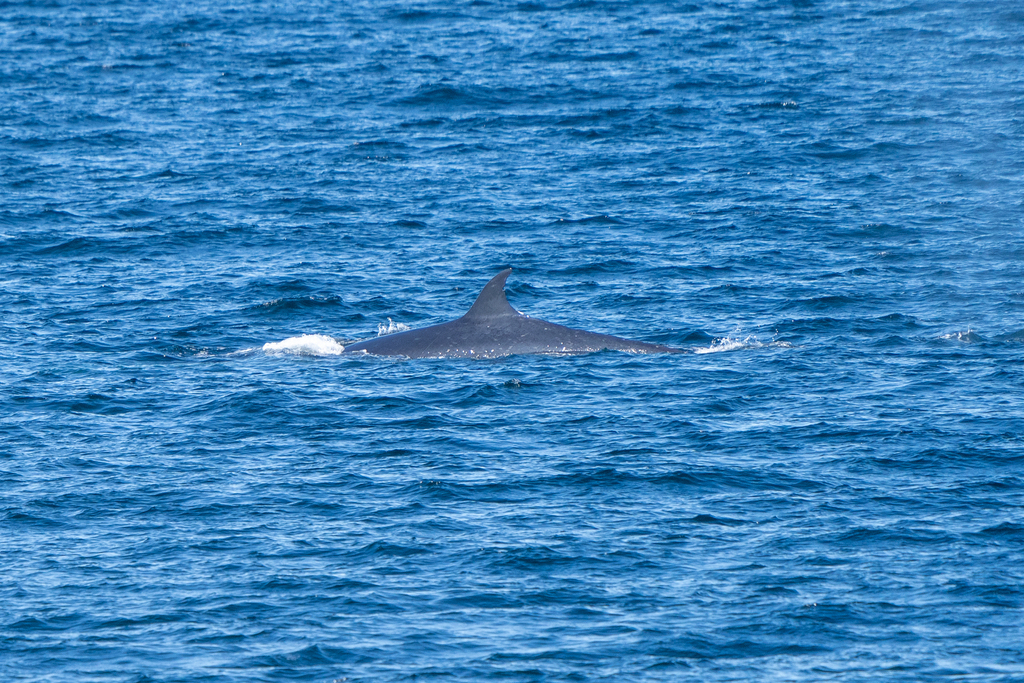
A sei whale showing distinctive upright dorsal fin

The sei whale's body is typically a dark steel grey with irregular light grey to white markings on the ventral surface, or towards the front of the lower body. The whale has a relatively short series of 32–60 pleats or grooves along its ventral surface that extend halfway between the pectoral fins and umbilicus (in other species it usually extends to or past the umbilicus), restricting the expansion of the buccal cavity during feeding compared to other species. The rostrum is pointed and the pectoral fins are relatively short, only 9–10% of body length, and pointed at the tips. Sei whales have a solitary ridge extending from the tip of the rostrum to the paired blowholes that are a distinctive characteristic of baleen whales.

Its skin is often marked by pits or wounds, which after healing become white scars. These are now known to be caused by cookie-cutter sharks (Isistius brasiliensis). It has a tall, sickle-shaped dorsal fin that ranges in height from 38–90 cm (15–35 in) and averages 53–56 cm (21–22 in), about two-thirds of the way back from the tip of the rostrum. Dorsal fin shape, pigmentation pattern, and scarring have been used to a limited extent in photo-identification studies. The tail is thick and the fluke, or lobe, is relatively small in relation to the size of the whale's body.

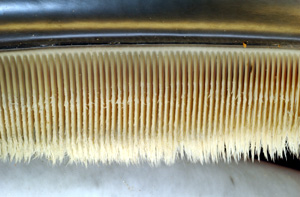
Close-up view of baleen plates, used to strain food from the water

Adults have 300–380 ashy-black baleen plates on each side of the mouth, up to 80 cm (31 in) long. Each plate is made of fingernail-like keratin, which is bordered by a fringe of very fine, short, curly, wool-like white bristles. The sei's very fine (and highly calcified and stiff) baleen bristles, about 0.1 mm (0.0039 in), are the most reliable characteristic that distinguishes it from other rorquals.

The sei whale looks very similar to other large rorquals, especially to its smaller relative the Bryde's whale. Exceptional individuals may resemble a fin whale, which leads to confusion. They are usually differentiated from the fin whale by the colour of their head. Contrary to the fin whale's smooth rostrum, the sei whale's rostrum is curved.

=== Size ===
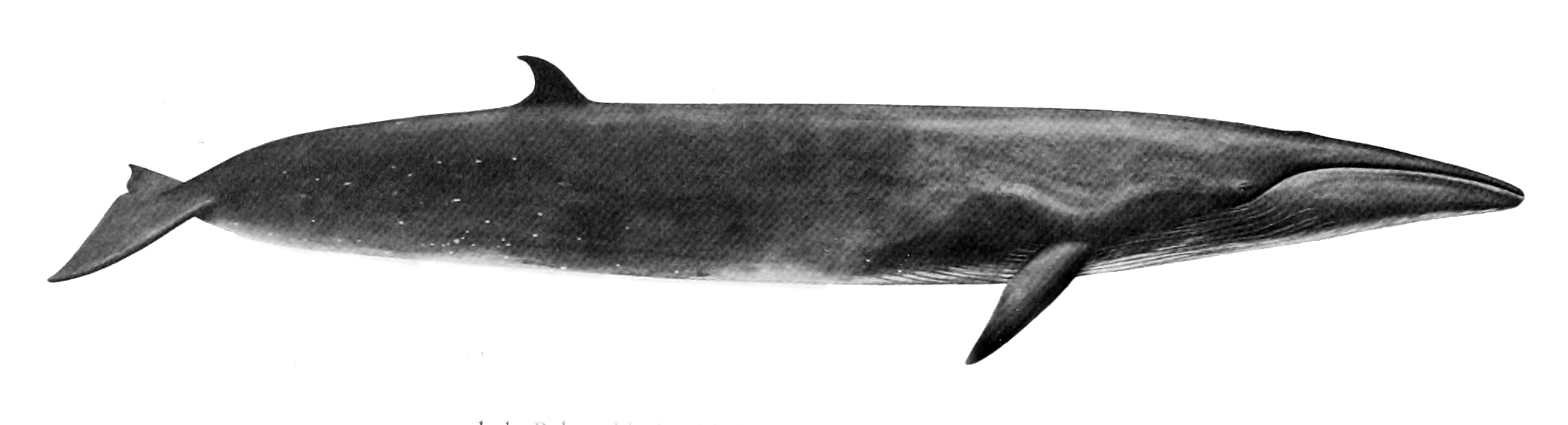
Painting of a sei whale

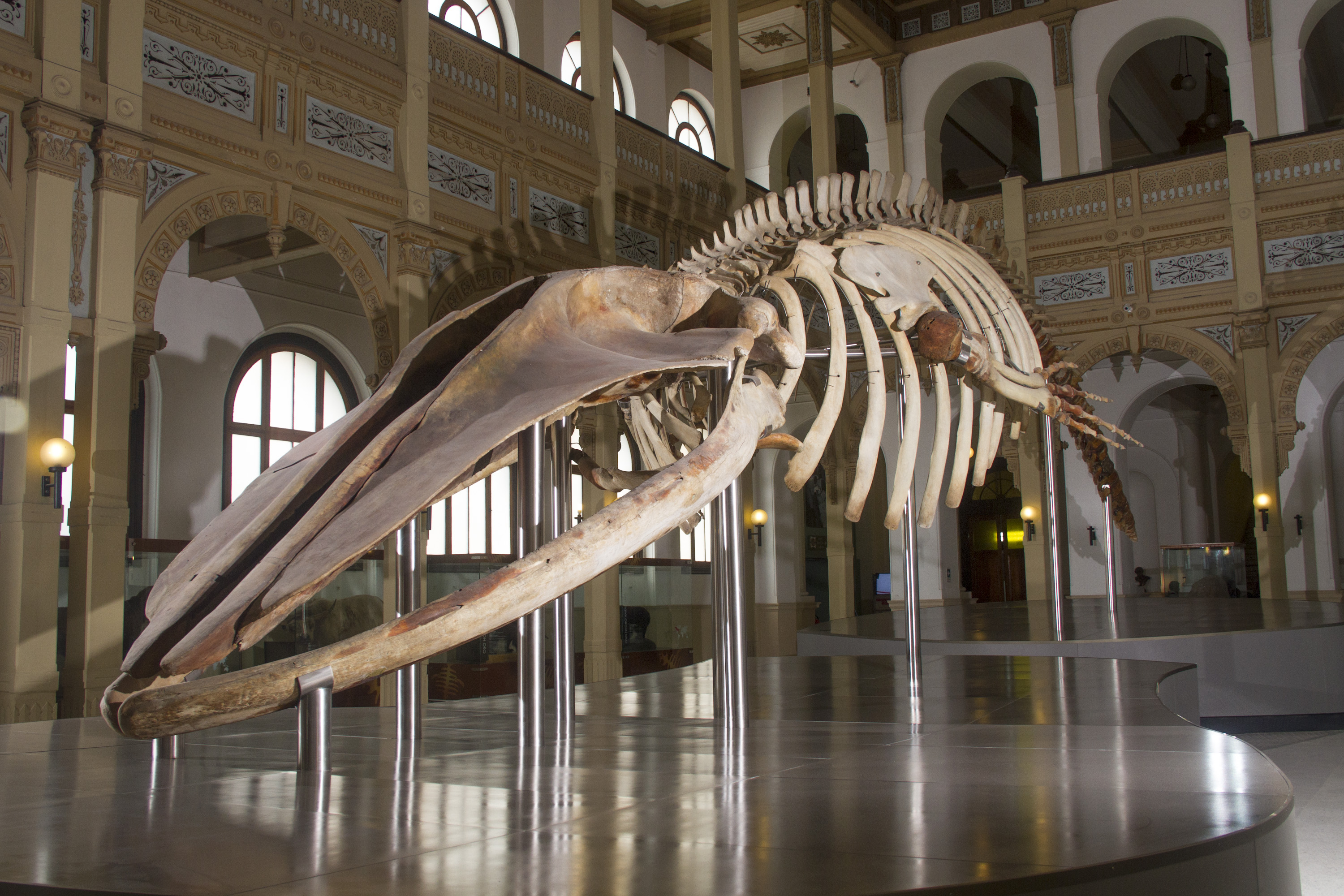
Sei whale skeleton

The sei whale is the third-largest balaenopterid, after the blue whale and the fin whale. Adults usually weigh between 15 and 20 t (15 and 20 long tons; 17 and 22 short tons). They exhibit sexual dimorphism, with females outweighing and being longer than their male counterparts. At birth, a calf typically measures 4.4–4.5 m (14–15 ft) in length.

In the Northern Hemisphere, males reach up to 17.1 m (56 ft) and females up to 18.6 m (61 ft), while in the Southern Hemisphere males reach a maximum of 18.6 m (61 ft) and females of 19.5 m (64 ft). The authenticity of an alleged 22 m (72 ft) female caught 80 km (50 mi) northwest of St. Kilda in July 1911 is doubted. Five specimens taken off Iceland exceeded 14.6 m (48 ft) in length. The longest measured during JARPN II cruises in the North Pacific were a 16.32 m (53.5 ft) female and a 15 m (49 ft) male.

In the North Pacific, adult males average 13.7 m (45 ft) and adult females 15 m (49 ft). In the North Atlantic, the average length of an adult male is 14 m (46 ft) and of an adult female is 14.5 m (48 ft). In the Southern Hemisphere, they average 14.5 m (48 ft) and 15 m (49 ft), in males and females, respectively.

In the North Pacific, males weigh an average of 15 t (15 long tons; 17 short tons) and females 18.5 t (18.2 long tons; 20.4 short tons). North Atlantic sei whale males average 15.5 t (15.3 long tons; 17.1 short tons) and females 17 t (17 long tons; 19 short tons). Southern Hemisphere whales average 17–18.5 t (16.7–18.2 long tons; 18.7–20.4 short tons) in body weight. The sei whale is estimated to have weighed up to 45 tonnes (50 short tons).

== Life history ==
=== Surface behaviours ===
Very little is known about the sei whale social structure. They have been documented traveling alone or in pods of up to six individuals; larger groups may assemble at particularly abundant feeding grounds. During the southern Gulf of Maine influx in mid-1986, groups of at least three sei whales were observed "milling" on four occasions – i.e. moving in random directions, rolling, and remaining at the surface for over 10 minutes. One whale would always leave the group during or immediately after such socializing bouts. The sei whale is among the fastest cetaceans. The American naturalist Roy Chapman Andrews compared the sei whale to the cheetah, because it can swim at great speeds "for a few hundred yards", but it "soon tires if the chase is long" and "does not have the strength and staying power of its larger relatives". It can reach speeds of up to 50–55 km/h (31–34 mph) over short distances. However, it is not a remarkable diver, reaching relatively shallow depths for 5 to 15 minutes. Between dives, the whale surfaces for a few minutes, remaining visible in clear, calm waters, with blows occurring at intervals of about 60 seconds (range: 45–90 sec.). When about to dive, the sei whale usually just sinks below the surface; only the dorsal fin and blowholes protrude. The whale is generally less active on water surfaces than other whale species; they rarely exhibit lobtail behaviour.

=== Feeding ===
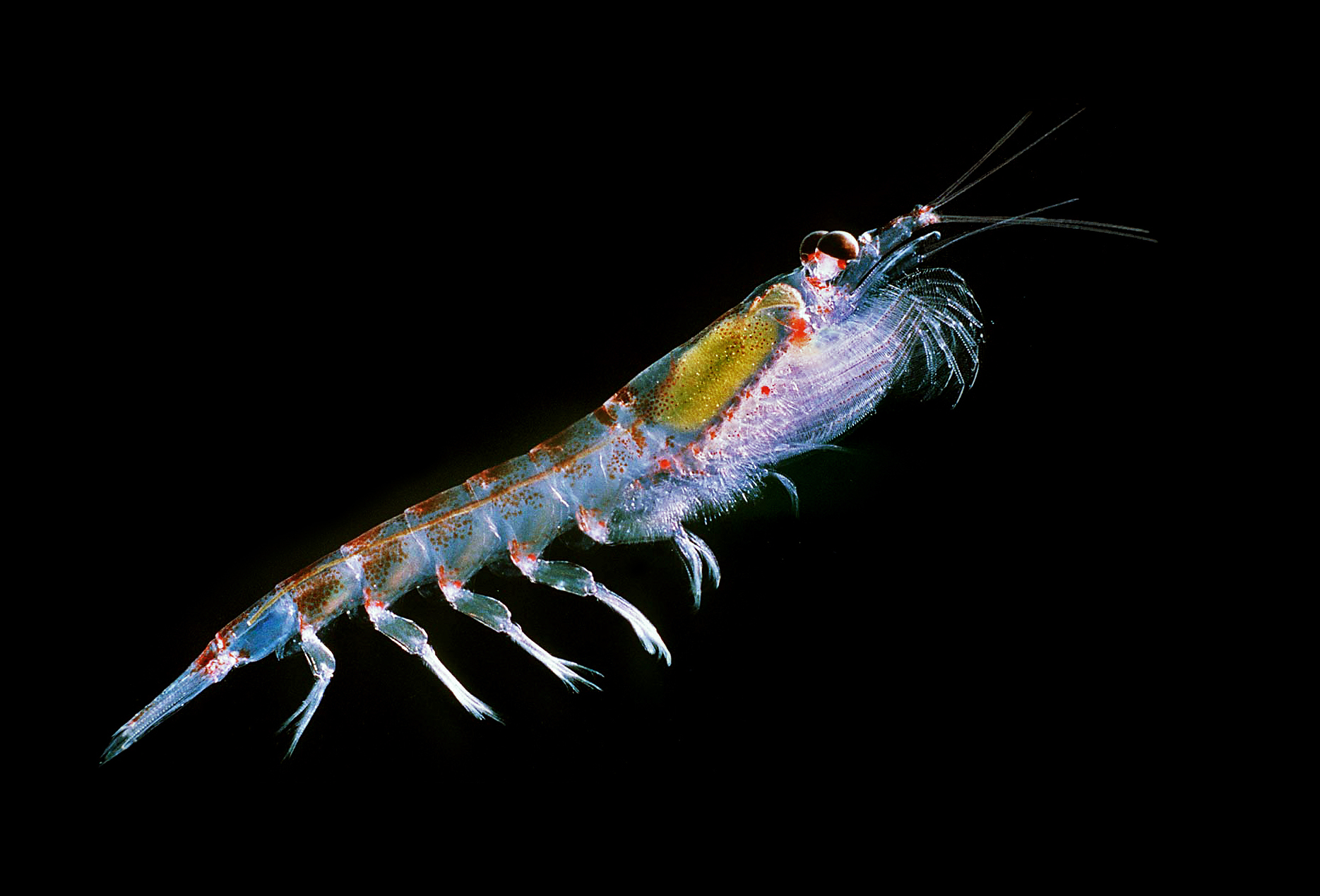
Krill, shrimp-like marine invertebrate animals, are one of the sei whale's primary foods.

This rorqual is a filter feeder, using its baleen plates to obtain its food by opening its mouth, engulfing or skimming large amounts of the water containing the food, then straining the water out through the baleen, trapping any food items inside its mouth.

The sei whale feeds near the surface of the ocean, swimming on its side through swarms of prey to obtain its average of about 900 kg (2,000 lb) of food each day. For an animal of its size, its preferred prey lies low within the food chain; this includes zooplankton and small fish. The whale's diet preferences has been determined from stomach analyses, direct observation of feeding behavior, and analyzing fecal matter collected near them, which appears as a dilute brown cloud. The feces are collected in nets and DNA is separated, individually identified, and matched with known species. The whale competes for food against different baleen whales.

In the North Atlantic, it feeds primarily on calanoid copepods, specifically Calanus finmarchicus, with a secondary preference for euphausiids, in particular Meganyctiphanes norvegica and Thysanoessa inermis. In the North Pacific, it feeds on similar zooplankton, including the copepod species Neocalanus cristatus, N. plumchrus, and Calanus pacificus, and euphausiid species Euphausia pacifica, E. similis, Thysanoessa inermis, T. longipes, T. gregaria and T. spinifera. In addition, it eats larger organisms, such as the Japanese flying squid, Todarodes pacificus pacificus, and small fish, including anchovies (Engraulis japonicus and E. mordax), sardines (Sardinops sagax), Pacific saury (Cololabis saira), mackerel (Scomber japonicus and S. australasicus), jack mackerel (Trachurus symmetricus) and juvenile rockfish (Sebastes jordani). Off central California, they mainly feed on anchovies between June and August, and on krill (Euphausia pacifica) during September and October. In the Southern Hemisphere, prey species include the copepods Neocalanus tonsus, Calanus simillimus, and Drepanopus pectinatus, as well as the euphausiids Euphausia superba and Euphausia vallentini and the pelagic amphipod Themisto gaudichaudii.

=== Parasites and epibiotics ===
Ectoparasites and epibiotics are rare on sei whales. Species of the parasitic copepod Pennella were only found on 8% of sei whales caught off California and 4% of those taken off South Georgia and South Africa. The pseudo-stalked barnacle Xenobalanus globicipitis was found on 9% of individuals caught off California; it was also found on a sei whale taken off South Africa. The acorn barnacle Coronula reginae and the stalked barnacle Conchoderma virgatum were each only found on 0.4% of whales caught off California. Remora australis were rarely found on sei whales off California (only 0.8%). They often bear scars from the bites of cookiecutter sharks, with 100% of individuals sampled off California, South Africa, and South Georgia having them; these scars have also been found on sei whales captured off Finnmark. Diatom (Cocconeis ceticola) films on sei whales are rare, having been found on sei whales taken off California and South Georgia.

Due to their diverse diet, endoparasites are frequent and abundant in sei whales. The harpacticoid copepod Balaenophilus unisetus infests the baleen of sei whales caught off California, South Georgia, South Africa, and Finnmark. The ciliate protozoan Haematophagus was commonly found in the baleen of sei whales taken off South Georgia (nearly 85%). They often carry heavy infestations of acanthocephalans (e.g. Bolbosoma turbinella, which was found in 40% of sei whales sampled off California; it was also found in individuals off South Georgia and Finnmark) and cestodes (e.g. Tetrabothrius affinis, found in sei whales off California and South Georgia) in the intestine, nematodes in the kidneys (Crassicauda sp., California) and stomach (Anisakis simplex, nearly 60% of whales taken off California), and flukes (Lecithodesmus spinosus, found in 38% of individuals caught off California) in the liver.

=== Reproduction ===
Mating occurs in temperate, subtropical seas during the winter. Gestation is estimated to vary around 10 3/4 months, 11 1/4 months, or one year. During the breeding period, a mating pair will remain together.

A newborn is weaned from its mother at 6–9 months of age, when it is 8–9 m (26–30 ft) long, so weaning takes place at the summer or autumn feeding grounds. Females reproduce every 2–3 years, usually to a single calf. In the Northern Hemisphere, males are usually 12.8–12.9 m (42–42 ft) and females 13.3–13.5 m (44–44 ft) at sexual maturity, while in the Southern Hemisphere, males average 13.6 m (45 ft) and females 14 m (46 ft). The average age of sexual maturity of both sexes is 5.6–11.7 years. The whales can reach ages up to 70 years. The documented oldest living sei whale was 74 years old.

=== Vocalizations ===
The sei whale makes long, loud, low-frequency sounds. Relatively little is known about specific calls, but in 2003, observers noted sei whale calls in addition to sounds that could be described as "growls" or "whooshes" off the coast of the Antarctic Peninsula. Many calls consisted of multiple parts at different frequencies. This combination distinguishes their calls from those of other whales. Most calls last about a second, and occur in the 37–98 hertz range, well within the range of human hearing. The maximum volume of the vocal sequences is reported as 156 decibels relative to 1 micropascal (μPa) at a reference distance of one metre. An observer situated one metre from a vocalizing whale would perceive a volume roughly equivalent to the volume of a jackhammer operating two meters away.

In November 2002, scientists recorded calls in the presence of sei whales off Maui. All the calls were downswept tonal calls, all but two ranging from a mean high frequency of 39.1 Hz down to 21 Hz of 1.3 second duration – the two higher frequency downswept calls ranged from an average of 100.3 Hz to 44.6 Hz over 1 second of duration. These calls closely resembled and coincided with a peak in "20- to 35-Hz irregular repetition interval" downswept pulses described from seafloor recordings off Oahu, which had previously been attributed to fin whales. Between 2005 and 2007, low frequency downswept vocalizations were recorded in the Great South Channel, east of Cape Cod, Massachusetts, which were associated with the presence of sei whales. These calls averaged 82.3 Hz down to 34 Hz over about 1.4 seconds in duration. This call has also been reported from recordings in the Gulf of Maine, New England shelf waters, the mid-Atlantic Bight, and in Davis Strait. It likely functions as a contact call.

BBC News quoted Roddy Morrison, a former whaler active in South Georgia, as saying, "When we killed the sei whales, they used to make a noise, like a crying noise. They seemed so friendly, and they'd come round and they'd make a noise, and when you hit them, they cried really. I didn't think it was really nice to do that. Everybody talked about it at the time I suppose, but it was money. At the end of the day that's what counted at the time. That's what we were there for."

=== Predation ===
The only known predator of the sei whale is the killer whale. There were two cases of predation.

== Range and migration ==
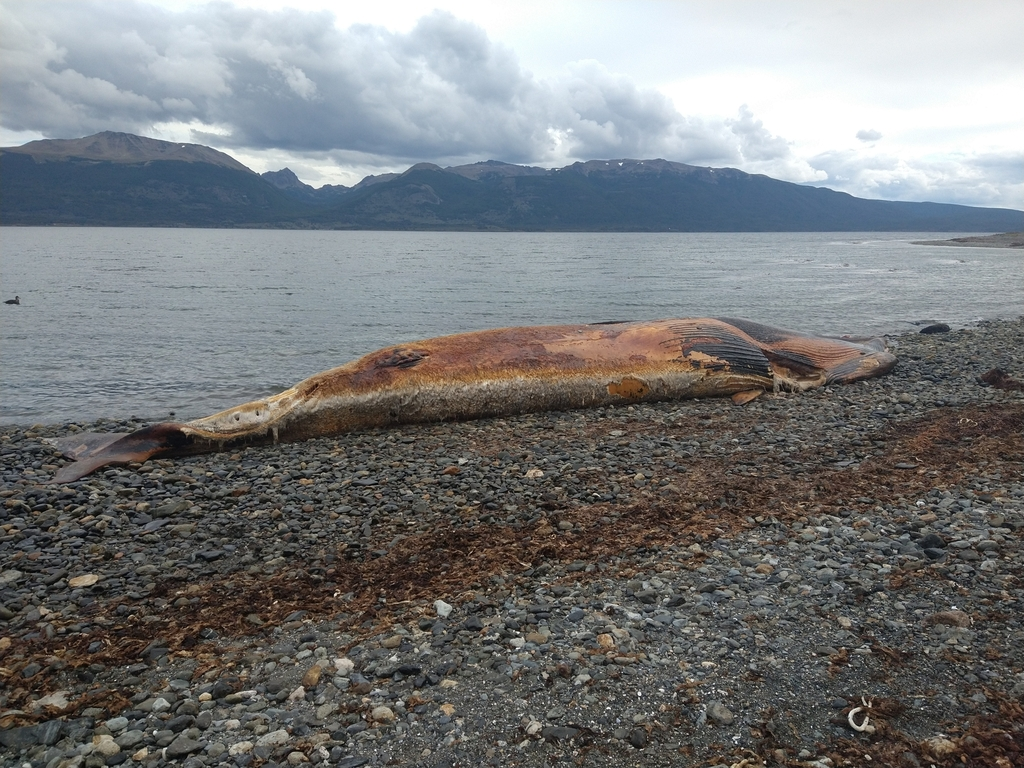
Beached sei whale carcass

Sei whales live in all oceans, although rarely in polar or tropical waters. The difficulty of differentiating them at sea from their close relatives, Bryde's whales and in some cases from fin whales, creates confusion about their range and population, especially in warmer waters where Bryde's whales are most common.

In the North Atlantic, its range extends from southern Europe or northwestern Africa to Norway, and from the southern United States to Greenland. The southernmost confirmed records are strandings along the northern Gulf of Mexico and in the Greater Antilles. It rarely enters the Mediterranean Sea and the Gulf of Mexico, which are both considered to be small waterbodies. Sei whales are pelagic and are typically found in basins in oceans or open seas.

In the North Pacific, it ranges from 20°N to 23°N latitude in the winter, and from 35°N to 50°N latitude in the summer. Approximately 75% of the North Pacific population lives east of the International Date Line. As of February 2017, the U.S. National Marine Fisheries Service estimated that the eastern North Pacific population stood at 374 whales. Two whales tagged in deep waters off California were later recaptured off Washington and British Columbia, revealing a possible link between these areas, but the lack of other tag recovery data makes these two cases inconclusive. Occurrences within the Gulf of California have been fewer. In Sea of Japan and Sea of Okhotsk, whales are not common, although whales were more commonly seen than today in southern part of Sea of Japan. There had been a sighting in Golden Horn Bay, and whales were much more abundant in the triangle area around Kunashir Island in whaling days, making the area well known as sei – ground. There had been sightings of the species off the Sea of Japan during cetacean surveys.

Sei whales have been recorded from northern Indian Ocean as well such as around Sri Lanka and Indian coasts. In the Southern Hemisphere, summer distribution based upon historic catch data is between 40°S and 50°S latitude in the South Atlantic and southern Indian Oceans and 45°S and 60°S in the South Pacific, while winter distribution is poorly known, with former winter whaling grounds being located off northeastern Brazil (7°S) and Peru (6°S). The majority of the "sei" whales caught off Angola and Congo, as well as other nearby areas in equatorial West Africa, are thought to have been predominantly misidentified Bryde's whales. For example, Ruud (1952) found that 42 of the "sei whale" caught off Gabon in 1952 were actually Bryde's whales, based on examination of their baleen plates. The only confirmed historical record is the capture of a 14 m (46 ft) female, which was brought to the Cap Lopez whaling station in Gabon in September 1950. During cetacean sighting surveys off Angola between 2003 and 2006, only a single confirmed sighting of two individuals was made in August 2004, compared to 19 sightings of Bryde's whales. Sei whales are commonly distributed along west to southern Latin America, including the entire Chilean coast down to the Beagle Channel. The Falkland Islands appear to be a regionally important area for the sei whale, as a small population exists in coastal waters off the eastern Falkland archipelago. For reasons unknown, the whales prefer to stay inland here, even venturing into large bays.

=== Migration ===
In general, the sei whale migrates annually from cool and subpolar waters in summer to temperate and subtropical waters for winter, where food is more abundant. In the northwest Atlantic, sightings and catch records suggest the whales move north along the shelf edge to arrive in the areas of Georges Bank, Northeast Channel, and Browns Bank by mid- to late- June. They are present off the south coast of Newfoundland in August and September, and a southbound migration begins moving west and south along the Nova Scotian shelf from mid-September to mid-November. Whales in the Labrador Sea as early as the first week of June may move farther northward and arrive at waters southwest of Greenland later in the summer. In the northeast Atlantic, the sei whale winters as far south as West Africa such as off Bay of Arguin, off coastal Western Sahara and follows the continental slope northward in spring. Large females lead the northward migration and reach the Denmark Strait earlier and more reliably than other sexes and classes, arriving in mid-July and remaining through mid-September. In some years, males and younger females remain at lower latitudes during the summer.

Despite knowing some general migration patterns, exact routes are incompletely known and scientists cannot readily predict exactly where groups will appear from one year to the next. A 1985 study suggested a correlation between appearances west of Greenland and the incursion of relatively warm waters from the Irminger Current into that area. Some evidence from tagging data indicates individuals return off the coast of Iceland on an annual basis. An individual satellite-tagged off Faial, in the Azores, traveled more than 4,000 km (2,500 mi) to the Labrador Sea via the Charlie–Gibbs fracture zone (CGFZ) between April and June 2005. It appeared to "hitch a ride" on prevailing currents, with erratic movements indicative of feeding behavior in five areas, in particular the CGFZ, an area of known high sei whale abundance as well as high copepod concentrations. Seven whales tagged off Faial and Pico from May to June in 2008 and 2009 made their way to the Labrador Sea, while an eighth individual tagged in September 2009 headed southeast – its signal was lost between Madeira and the Canary Islands.

== Whaling ==
The development of explosive harpoons and steam-powered whaling ships in the late nineteenth century brought previously unobtainable large whales within the reach of commercial whalers. Initially, the sei whale's speed and elusiveness partially protected them, and later the comparatively small yield of oil and meat. Once stocks of more profitable right whales, blue whales, fin whales, and humpback whales became depleted, sei whales were hunted in earnest, particularly from 1950 to 1980.

=== North Atlantic ===
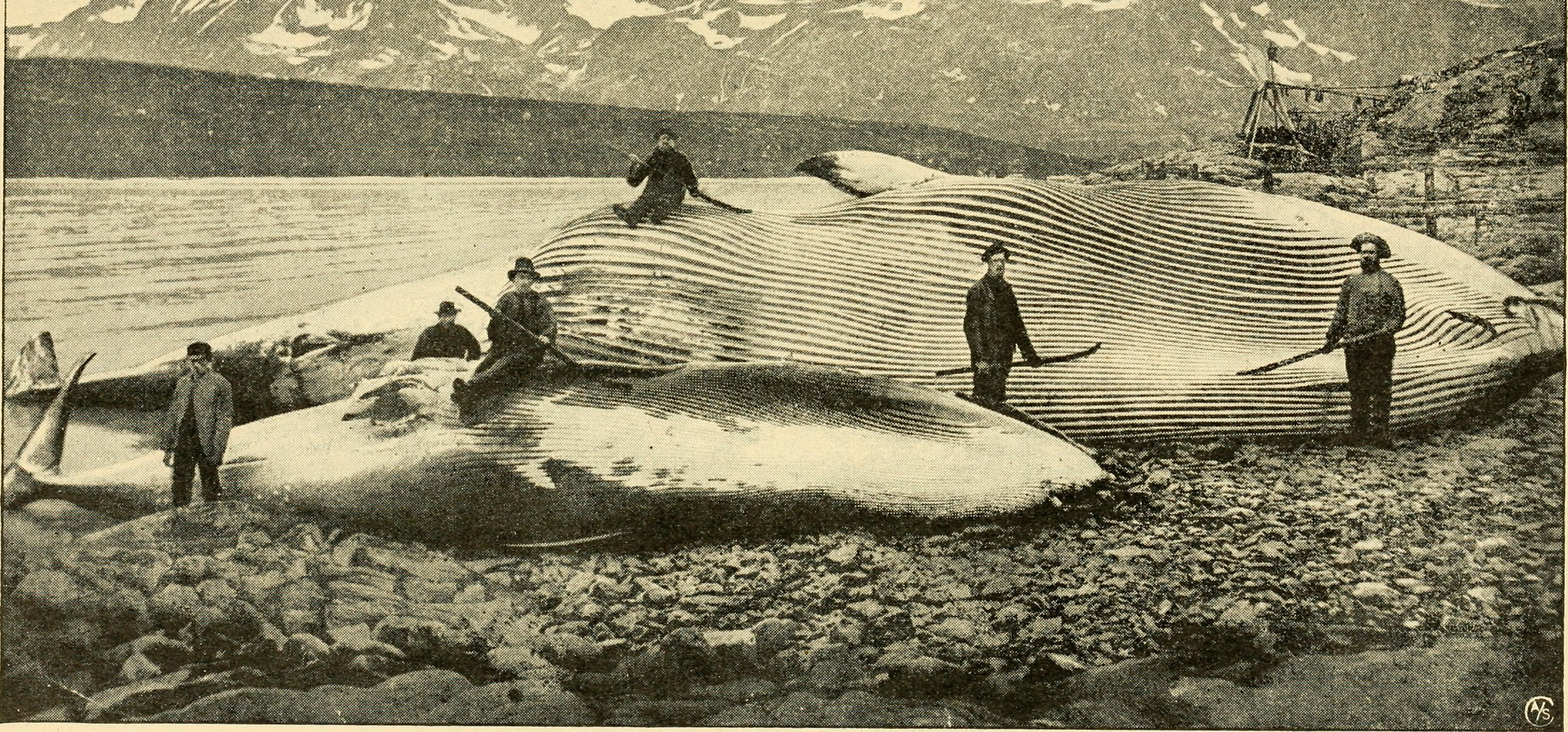
A sei whale (foreground) caught off Finnmark

In the North Atlantic between 1885 and 1984, 14,295 sei whales were taken. They were hunted in large numbers off the coasts of Norway and Scotland beginning in the late 19th and early 20th centuries, and in 1885 alone more than 700 were caught off Finnmark. Their meat was a popular Norwegian food. The meat's value made the hunting of this difficult-to-catch species profitable in the early twentieth century.

In Iceland, a total of 2,574 whales were taken from the Hvalfjörður whaling station between 1948 and 1985. Since the late 1960s to early 1970s, the sei whale was second only to the fin whale as the preferred target of Icelandic whalers, with meat in greater demand than whale oil, the prior target.

Small numbers were taken off the Iberian Peninsula, beginning in the 1920s by Spanish whalers, off the Nova Scotian shelf in the late 1960s and early 1970s by Canadian whalers, and off the coast of West Greenland from the 1920s to the 1950s by Norwegian and Danish whalers.

=== North Pacific ===
In the North Pacific, the total reported catch by commercial whalers was 72,215 between 1910 and 1975; the majority were taken after 1947. Shore stations in Japan and Korea processed 300–600 each year between 1911 and 1955. In 1959, the Japanese catch peaked at 1,340. Heavy exploitation in the North Pacific began in the early 1960s, with catches averaging 3,643 per year from 1963 to 1974 (total 43,719; annual range 1,280–6,053). In 1971, after a decade of high catches, it became scarce in Japanese waters, ending commercial whaling in the country by 1975.

Off the coast of North America, sei whales were hunted off British Columbia from the late 1950s to the mid-1960s, when the number of whales captured dropped to around 14 per year. More than 2,000 were caught in British Columbian waters between 1962 and 1967. Between 1957 and 1971, California shore stations processed 386 whales. Commercial Sei whaling ended in the eastern North Pacific in 1971.

=== Southern Hemisphere ===
A total of 152,233 were taken in the Southern Hemisphere between 1910 and 1979. Whaling in southern oceans originally targeted humpback whales. By 1913, this species became rare, and the catch of fin and blue whales began to increase. As these species likewise became scarce, sei whale catches increased rapidly in the late 1950s and early 1960s. The catch peaked in 1964–65 at over 20,000 sei whales, but by 1976, this number had dropped to below 2,000 and commercial whaling for the species ended in 1977.

=== Post-protection whaling ===
Since the moratorium on commercial whaling, some sei whales have been taken by Icelandic and Japanese whalers under the IWC's scientific research programme. Iceland carried out four years of scientific whaling between 1986 and 1989, killing up to 40 sei whales a year. The research is conducted by the Institute of Cetacean Research (ICR) in Tokyo, a privately funded, nonprofit institution. The main focus of the research is to examine what they eat and to assess the competition between whales and fisheries. In a span of 15 years, around 1,453 whales were killed in the North Pacific between 2002 and 2017.

Conservation groups, such as the World Wildlife Fund, dispute the value of this research, claiming that sei whales feed primarily on squid and plankton which are not hunted by humans, and only rarely on fish. At the 2001 meeting of the IWC Scientific Committee, 32 scientists submitted a document expressing their belief that the Japanese program lacked scientific rigor and would not meet minimum standards of academic review.

In 2010, a Los Angeles exclusive sushi restaurant confirmed to be serving sei whale meat was closed by its owners after a covert investigation and protests lead to prosecution by authorities for handling an endangered/protected species.

== Conservation status ==
Member states of the International Whaling Commission (in blue)

The sei whale is listed by the IUCN Red List as endangered, and with an increasing population trend, as of 2018. The sei whale did not have meaningful international protection until 1970, when the International Whaling Commission first set catch quotas for the North Pacific for individual species. Before quotas, there were no legal limits. Complete protection from commercial whaling in the North Pacific came in 1976.

Quotas on sei whales in the North Atlantic began in 1977. Southern Hemisphere stocks were protected in 1979. Facing mounting evidence that several whale species were threatened with extinction, the IWC established a complete moratorium on commercial whaling beginning in 1986. In the late 1970s, some "pirate" whaling took place in the eastern North Atlantic. There is no direct evidence of illegal whaling in the North Pacific, despite the acknowledged misreporting of whaling data by the Soviet Union.

Northern Hemisphere populations are listed in CITES Appendix II, indicating they are not immediately threatened with extinction, but may become so if they are not listed. Populations in the Southern Hemisphere are listed in CITES Appendix I, indicating they are threatened with extinction if trade is not halted. The sei whale is listed on both Appendix I and Appendix II of the Convention on the Conservation of Migratory Species of Wild Animals (CMS). It is listed on Appendix I as this species has been categorized as being in danger of extinction throughout all or a significant proportion of their range and CMS parties strive towards strictly protecting these animals, and also on Appendix II. The species is listed as endangered by the U.S. government National Marine Fisheries Service under the U.S. Endangered Species Act.

=== Population estimates ===
As of 2018, the global population is estimated to be 50,000 mature individuals, with an increasing population trend. In the North Atlantic, 12,000 whales were estimated. As of 1983, around 10,000 whales were estimated in the Southern Hemisphere, and by 2011, approximately 35,000 individuals inhabited the North Pacific.

Sei whales were said to have been scarce in the 1960s and early 1970s off northern Norway. One possible explanation for this disappearance is that the whales were overexploited. The drastic reduction in northeastern Atlantic copepod stocks during the late 1960s may be another culprit. Surveys in the Denmark Strait found 1,290 whales in 1987, and 1,590 whales in 1989. Nova Scotia's 1977 population estimates were between 1,393 and 2,248, with a minimum of 870.

A 1977 study estimated Pacific Ocean totals of 9,110, based upon catch and CPUE data. Japanese interests claim this figure is outdated, and in 2002 claimed the western North Pacific population was over 28,000, a figure not accepted by the scientific community. In western Canadian waters, researchers with Fisheries and Oceans Canada observed five seis together in the summer of 2017, the first such sighting in over 50 years. In California waters, there was only one confirmed and five possible sightings by 1991 to 1993 aerial and ship surveys, and there were no confirmed sightings off Oregon coasts such as Maumee Bay and Washington. Prior to commercial whaling, the North Pacific hosted an estimated 42,000. By the end of whaling, the population was down to between 7,260 and 12,620. In the Southern Hemisphere, population estimates range between 9,800 and 12,000, based upon catch history and CPUE. The IWC estimated 9,718 whales based upon survey data between 1978 and 1988. Prior to commercial whaling, there were an estimated 65,000.

Mass death events for sei whales have been recorded for many years and evidence suggests endemic poisoning (red tide) may have caused mass deaths in prehistoric times. In June 2015, scientists flying over southern Chile counted 337 dead sei whales, in what is regarded as the largest mass beaching ever documented. The cause is not yet known; however, toxic algae blooms caused by unprecedented warming in the Pacific Ocean, known as the Blob, may be implicated.

== See also ==
- List of cetaceans
- Pacific Islands Cetaceans Memorandum of Understanding
- HMS Daedalus (1826)
