= Hans Severin Holten =

Johan Severin Holten (11 July 1770 – 30 December 1805) was a Danish zoological writer, brother of Nicolai Holten, who was to become a Geheimrat, a high-ranking advisor at the imperial courts of the Holy Roman Empire.

== Biography ==
He was the son of a pharmacist in Helsingør, Johannes Holten (1741–1816) and his wife Anna Margrethe, born Abildgaard (1747–1826). He was born in Helsingør on 11 July 1770, and was named Johan after his father, but preferred to be known as Hans. During his upbringing and in his youth, he lived in the house of the Pentecostal priest P.D. Bast who was married to his aunt.

In 1788, he became a student of the Nykøbing School, where he studied zoology. Later, he became the curator of scientific collections made by Prince Christian Frederik, who was later to become Christian VIII of Denmark. In 1801 he took up the post of science tutor for Prince Christian's younger brother, Prince Ferdinand, and at this time he lived at the royal residence of Sorgenfri Palace. In 1804 he accompanied the young prince on a journey to Germany and he was also the prince's librarian.

In 1799 while at Helsingør, he caught a rare fish, a John Dory (Zeus faber), and noticed some parasites on the gills which he called "gillworms". He went on to provide the first description of these, calling them Chondracanthus merluccii, and later provided the first description of another gillworm from a flying fish, which he called Lernaea exocoeti, and which is now known as Pennella exocoeti.

Holten's only literary work is the Fauna or Animal History of Denmark and Norway, of which only 1 booklet (mammal) was published (1800), and a systematic auction catalog of Johann Hieronymus Chemnitz's collection of cones (1802).

On 19 February 1796, he married Fredensborg Juliane Marie Wittendorff (27 October 1770 – 13 March 1838), daughter of the royal cantor P.A. Wittendorff. Holten died in Copenhagen on 30 December 1805.
