= Chondracanthus (crustacean) =

Scientific classification
- Domain: Eukaryota
- Kingdom: Animalia
- Phylum: Arthropoda
- Class: Copepoda
- Order: Cyclopoida
- Family: Chondracanthidae
- Genus: Chondracanthus; Delaroche, 1811

Genus of crustaceans

Chondracanthus is a parasitic copepod genus in the family Chondracanthidae, containing the following species:

- Chondracanthus australis Ho, 1991
- Chondracanthus barnardi Ho, 1972
- Chondracanthus brotulae Capart, 1959
- Chondracanthus colligens Barnard, 1955
- Chondracanthus cottunculi Rathbun, 1886
- Chondracanthus deltoideus Fraser, 1920
- Chondracanthus distortus C. B. Wilson, 1922
- Chondracanthus genypteri G. M. Thomson, 1890
- Chondracanthus goldsmidi Tang, Andrews & Cobcroft, 2007
- Chondracanthus gracilis Fraser, 1920
- Chondracanthus heterostichi Ho, 1972
- Chondracanthus horridus Heller, 1865
- Chondracanthus irregularis Fraser, 1920
- Chondracanthus janebennettae Causey, 1953
- Chondracanthus lepidionis Kabata, 1970
- Chondracanthus lepophidii Ho, 1974
- Chondracanthus lophii Johnston, 1836
- Chondracanthus merluccii (Holten, 1802)
- Chondracanthus multituberculatus (Markevich, 1956)
- Chondracanthus narium Kabata, 1969
- Chondracanthus neali Leigh-Sharpe, 1930
- Chondracanthus nodosus (O. F. Müller, 1776)
- Chondracanthus ornatus T. Scott, 1900
- Chondracanthus palpifer C. B. Wilson, 1912
- Chondracanthus pinguis C. B. Wilson, 1912
- Chondracanthus polymixiae Yamaguti, 1939
- Chondracanthus psetti Kroyer, 1863
- Chondracanthus pusillus Kabata, 1968
- Chondracanthus shiinoi Yamaguti, 1963
- Chondracanthus solidus (Gusev, 1951)
- Chondracanthus theragrae Yamaguti, 1939
- Chondracanthus triventricosus Sekerak, 1970
- Chondracanthus tuberculatus Nordmann, 1832
- Chondracanthus wilsoni Ho, 1971
- Chondracanthus yabei J. S. Ho, I.H. Kim & Nagasawa, 2005
- Chondracanthus yanezi Atria, 1980
- Chondracanthus zei Delaroche, 1811
