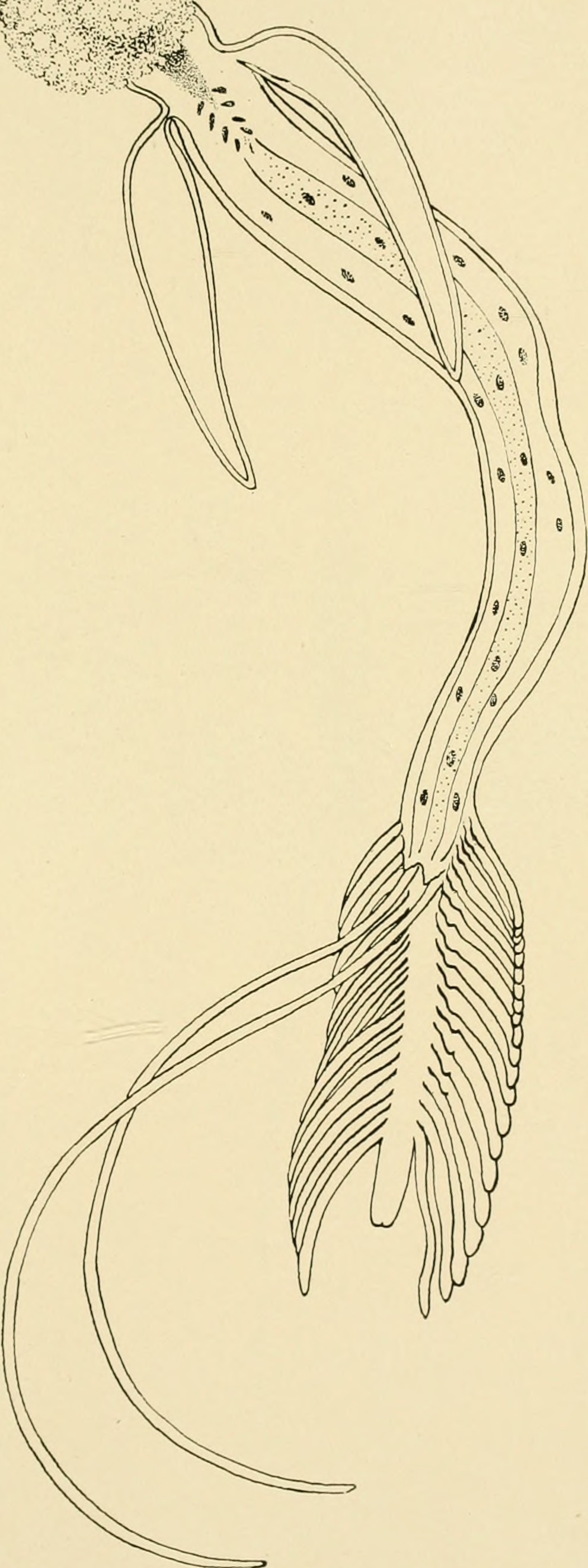
- Pennella sagitta

Scientific classification
- Domain: Eukaryota
- Kingdom: Animalia
- Phylum: Arthropoda
- Class: Copepoda
- Order: Siphonostomatoida
- Family: Pennellidae
- Genus: Pennella; Oken, 1815

Type species
- Pennella diodontis Oken, 1815

Species
- See text.

Synonyms
- Baculus Lubbock, 1860; Hessella Brady, 1883; Lernaeopenna Blainville, 1822; Pennatula Linnaeus, 1758

= Pennella =

Genus of crustaceans

Pennella is a genus of large copepods which are common parasites of large pelagic fishes. They begin their life cycle as a series of free-swimming planktonic larvae. The females metamorphose into a parasitic stage when they attach to a host and enter into its skin. The males are free swimming. Due to their large size and mesoparasitic life history there have been a number of studies of Pennella, the members of which are among the largest of the parasitic Copepoda. All species are found as adults buried into the flesh of marine bony fish, except for a single species, Pennella balaenopterae which can be found in the muscles and blubber of cetaceans and occasionally other marine mammals, and is the largest species of copepod.

== Biology ==
Like most parasitic copepods it is the female which is parasitic in Pennella while the males are free swimming. The female has a two host life cycle and egg production commences when an inseminated female settles on its ultimate host, usually a large marine fish such as a member of the cod family Gadidae or tuna. The intermediate host is usually a flatfish or a cephalopod. Before the parasite settles on the intermediate host there are two free swimming or copepodid larval stages, after which it settles on the gill tips of the intermediate host as a sessile chalimus larva. After four chalimus stages on the intermediate host the parasite becomes sexually mature and the free swimming males begin to copulate with the females while they are still sessile, a week after attaining maturity the females leave the intermediate host. Whether or not the females have copulated they become free swimming and the males will inseminate free swimming females as well. After a brief period as a free swimming animal the female infects its ultimate host and begins its main period of adult growth and begins to release eggs into the water.

== Species ==
The genus contains 15 species:

- Pennella balaenopterae Koren & Danielssen, 1877
- Pennella cylindrica (Brady, 1883)
- Pennella diodontis Oken, 1815
- Pennella elegans Gnanamuthu, 1957
- Pennella elongata (Lubbock, 1860)
- Pennella exocoeti (Holten, 1802)
- Pennella filosa (Linnaeus, 1758)
- Pennella hawaiiensis Kazachenko & Kurochkin, 1974
- Pennella instructa C. B. Wilson, 1917
- Pennella makaira Hogans, 1988
- Pennella oxyporhamphi Sebastian, 1966
- Pennella sagitta (Linnaeus, 1758)
- Pennella selaris Kirtisinghe, 1964
- Pennella tridentata Listowsky, 1892
- Pennella varians Steenstrup & Lütken, 1861
