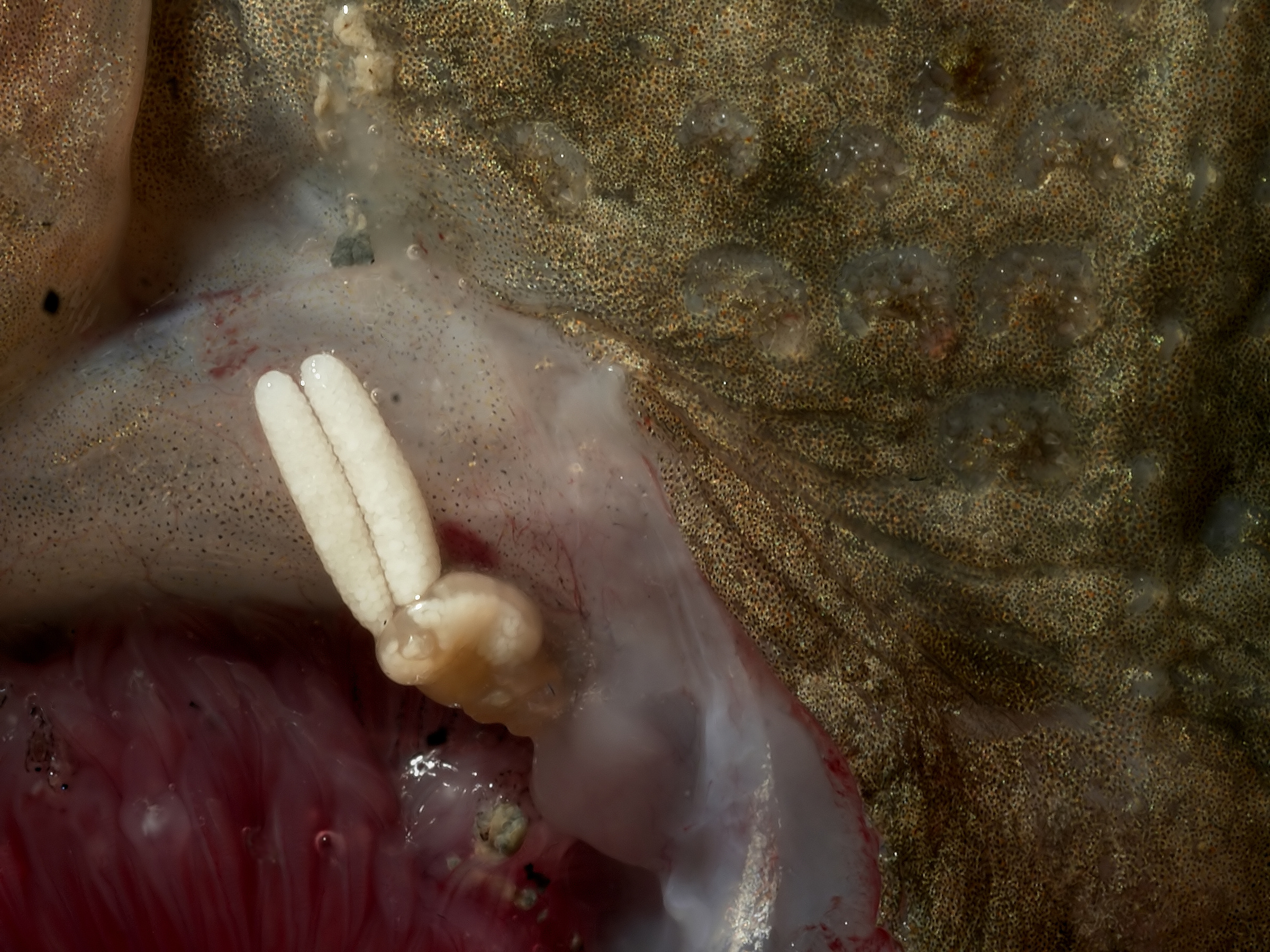
- Acanthochondria cornuta

Scientific classification
- Kingdom: Animalia
- Phylum: Arthropoda
- Clade: Pancrustacea
- Class: Copepoda
- Order: Cyclopoida
- Suborder: Ergasilida
- Family: Chondracanthidae; H. Milne-Edwards, 1840

Synonyms
- Lernaeosoleidae; Pharodidae

= Chondracanthidae =

Family of crustaceans

Chondracanthidae is a family of parasitic copepods, usually found infecting the branchial chamber of demersal fishes. It comprises the following genera:

- Acanthocanthopsis Heegaard, 1945
- Acanthochondria Oakley, 1930
- Acanthochondrites Oakley, 1930
- Andreina Brian, 1939
- Apodochondria Ho & Dojiri, 1988
- Argentinochondria Etchegoin, Timi & Sardella, 2003
- Auchenochondria Dojiri & Perkins, 1979
- Bactrochondria Ho, I. H. Kim & Kumar, 2000
- Berea Yamaguti, 1963
- Bereacanthus Huys, 2009
- Blias Krøyer, 1863
- Brachiochondria Shiino, 1957
- Brachiochondrites Markevich, 1940
- Brasilochondria Thatcher & Pereira Júnior, 2004
- Ceratochondria Yu, 1935
- Chelonichondria Ho, 1994
- Chondracanthodes C. B. Wilson, 1932
- Chondracanthus Delaroche, 1811
- Cryptochondria Izawa, 1971
- Diocus Krøyer, 1863
- Heterochondria Yu, 1935
- Hoia Avdeev & Kazachenko, 1986
- Humphreysia Leigh-Sharpe, 1934
- Immanthe Leigh-Sharpe, 1934
- Juanettia C. B. Wilson, 1921
- Jusheyhoea Villalba & Fernandez, 1985
- Lagochondria Ho & Dojiri, 1988
- Lateracanthus Kabata & Gussev, 1966
- Lernentoma Blainville, 1822
- Markevitchielinus Titar, 1975
- Mecaderochondria Ho & Dojiri, 1987
- Medesicaste Kroyer, 1863
- Neobrachiochondria Kabata, 1969
- Pharodes C. B. Wilson, 1935
- Praecidochondria Kabata, 1968
- Prochondracanthopsis Shiino, 1960
- Prochondracanthus Yamaguti, 1939
- Protochondracanthus Kirtisinghe, 1950
- Protochondria Ho, 1970
- Pseudacanthocanthopsis Yamaguti & Yamasu, 1959
- Pseudoblias Heegaard, 1962
- Pseudochondracanthus C. B. Wilson, 1908
- Pseudodiocus Ho, 1972
- Pseudolernentoma Luque & Alves, 2003
- Rhynchochondria Ho, 1967
- Rohdea Kabata, 1992
- Scheherazade Leigh-Sharpe, 1934
- Strabax von Nordmann, 1864
