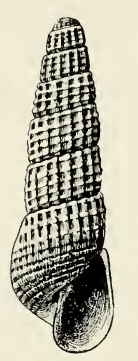
- Apertural view of the shell of Odostomia scammonensis

Scientific classification
- Kingdom: Animalia
- Phylum: Mollusca
- Class: Gastropoda
- Family: Pyramidellidae
- Genus: Odostomia
- Species: O. scammonensis

Binomial name
- Odostomia scammonensis Dall & Bartsch, 1909

= Odostomia scammonensis =

Species of gastropod

Odostomia scammonensis is a species of sea snail, a marine gastropod mollusc in the family Pyramidellidae, the pyrams and their allies.

According to the Smithsonian Institution Odostomia scammonensis has received the same collection number as Odostomia talama Dall & Bartsch, 1909

== Description ==
The large shell is white and has an elongate-conic shape. Its length measures 5.1 mm. The whorls of the protoconch are smooth, deeply obliquely immersed in the first of the succeeding turns, above which only a portion of the last volution projects. The eight whorls of the teleoconch are very slightly rounded, moderately contracted at the sutures, slightly excurved at the shouldered summit. They are marked by strong, vertical axial ribs, of which 16 occur upon the second and third, 18 upon the fourth, 20 upon the fifth and sixth, and 26 upon the penultimate turn. The intercostal spaces are about twice as wide as the ribs, crossed by five slender spiral cords between the sutures, which render the ribs feebly nodulous at their junction. The sutures are strongly impressed. The periphery and the base of the body whorl are decidedly inflated, the latter narrowly umbilicated. They are marked by seven weak spiral cords. The aperture is large and elongate-oval. The outer lip is thin, showing the external sculpture within. The columella is slender, curved, reflected. It is provided with a strong fold at its insertion.

== Distribution ==
This species occurs in the Pacific Ocean off Scammon's Lagoon, Hipolito Point, and Punta Abreojos, Baja California Sur.
