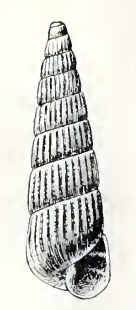
- Drawing of a shell of Turbonilla ignacia

Scientific classification
- Kingdom: Animalia
- Phylum: Mollusca
- Class: Gastropoda
- Family: Pyramidellidae
- Genus: Turbonilla
- Species: T. ignacia

Binomial name
- Turbonilla ignacia Dall & Bartsch, 1909

Synonyms
- Turbonilla (Mormula) ignacia Dall & Bartsch, 1909

= Turbonilla ignacia =

Species of gastropod

Turbonilla ignacia is a species of sea snail, a marine gastropod mollusk in the family Pyramidellidae, the pyrams and their allies.

== Description ==
The milk-white shell is small and has an elongate-conic shape. Its length measures 4.1 mm. The 2½ whorls of the protoconch form a depressed, helicoid spire, whose axis is at right angles to that of the succeeding turns, in the first of which it is about one-fifth immersed. The nine whorls of the teleoconch are slightly rounded, appressed at the summit, and moderately contracted at the suture. They are marked by low, rather broad, rounded, almost vertical axial ribs, of which 18 occur upon the second to fourth, 20 upon the fifth, 22 upon the sixth, 24 upon the seventh, and 28 upon the penultimate turn. The intercostal spaces a little narrower than the ribs. They are marked by six spiral series of well incised, equally spaced pits. The periphery and the base of the body whorl are well rounded. They are marked by the very feeble continuations of the axial ribs, and numerous exceedingly fine spiral striations. The aperture is rhomboidal. The posterior angle is obtuse. The outer lip is thick. It is reinforced by two strong spiral lamellae, one of which is a little posterior to the periphery and the other a little posterior to the middle between the periphery and the summit. The columella is rather strong, and decidedly twisted with an oblique fold a little below its insertion.

== Distribution ==
The type specimen was found in the Pacific Ocean off San Ignacio Lagoon, Baja California.
