= Ojo de Liebre =

Ojo de Liebre may refer to:

- Laguna Ojo de Liebre, lagoon in northwestern Mexico
- Another name for the Tempranillo variety of grape
- Another name for the Albillo variety of grape
