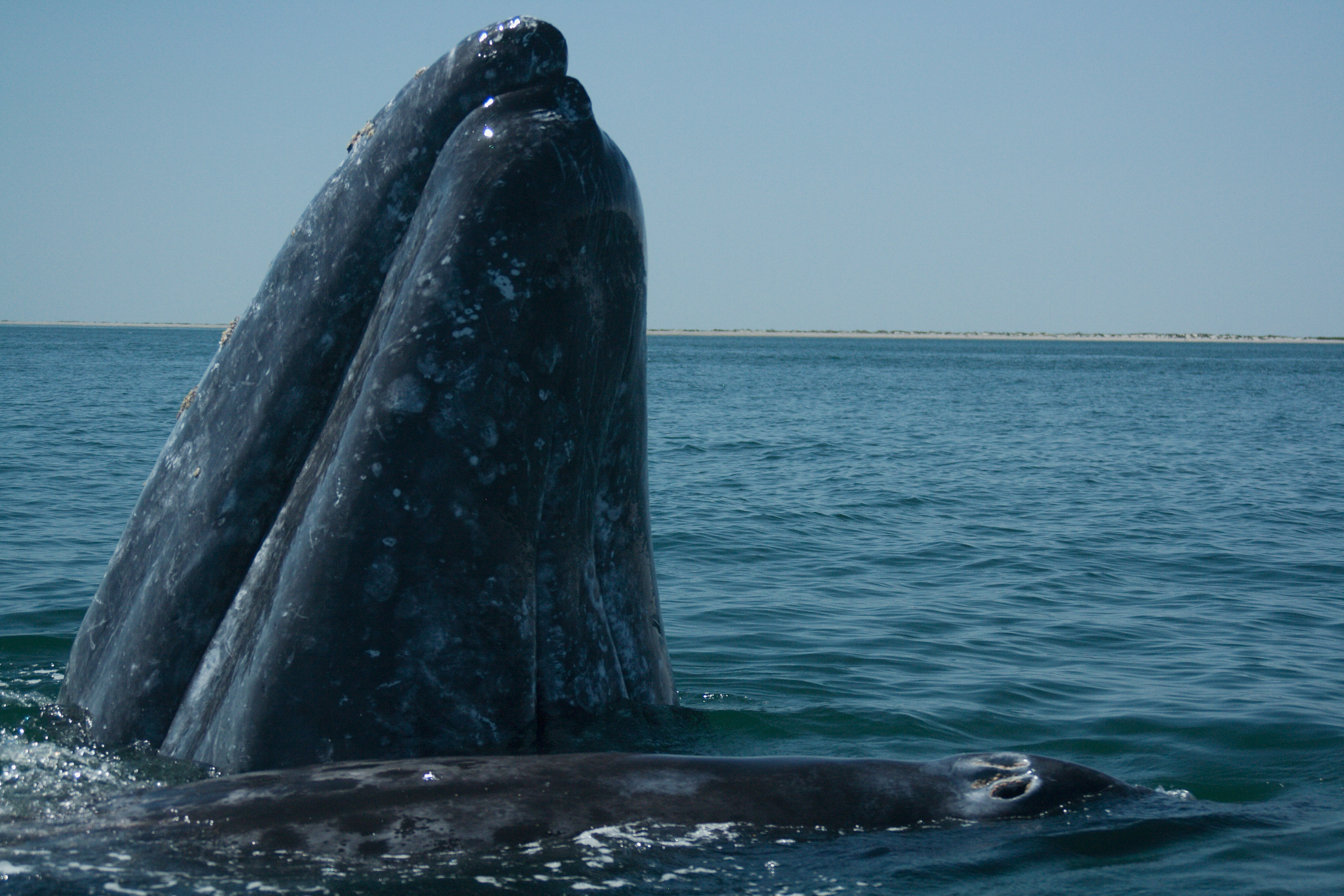
- Gray whale spy-hopping next to calf
- Size compared to an average human

Conservation status
- Least Concern (IUCN 3.1)

- Apparently Secure (NatureServe)
- CITES Appendix I

Scientific classification
- Kingdom: Animalia
- Phylum: Chordata
- Class: Mammalia
- Order: Artiodactyla
- Infraorder: Cetacea
- Family: Eschrichtiidae
- Genus: Eschrichtius
- Species: E. robustus

Binomial name
- Eschrichtius robustus Lilljeborg, 1861
- Gray whale range

Synonyms
- Balaena gibbosa Erxleben, 1777; Agaphelus glaucus Cope, 1868; Rhachianectes glaucus Cope, 1869; Eschrichtius gibbosus Van Deinse & Junge, 1937; E. glaucus Maher, 1961

= Gray whale =

Gray whale Temporal range: Late Pleistocene–Recent

Species of baleen whale

The gray whale (Eschrichtius robustus), also known as the grey whale, is a baleen whale that migrates between feeding and breeding grounds yearly. It reaches a length of 14.9–15.2 m (49–50 ft), a weight of up to 41 to 45 tonnes (45 to 50 short tons; 40 to 44 long tons) and lives between 55 and 70 years, although one female was estimated to be 75–80 years of age. One of the longest-living gray whales currently is a female, first sighted in 1977, and estimated to be 53–55 years old as of 2024. The common name of the whale comes from the gray patches and white mottling on its dark skin. Gray whales were once called "devil fish" because of their fighting behavior when hunted, with mothers accompanied by their calves fighting viciously to protect their young if they are attacked. The gray whale is the sole living species in the genus Eschrichtius. It is the sole living genus in the family Eschrichtiidae; however, some recent studies classify it as a member of the family Balaenopteridae. This mammal is descended from filter-feeding whales that appeared during the Neogene.

The gray whale is distributed in a Northeast Pacific (North American), and an endangered Northwest Pacific (Asian), population. North Atlantic populations were extirpated (perhaps by whaling) on the European coast in the 12th to 14th centuries, and on the American and African Atlantic coasts around the late 17th to early 18th centuries. However, in the 2010s and 2020s there have been rare sightings of gray whales in the North Atlantic, Mediterranean, and even off South Atlantic coasts.

== Taxonomy ==
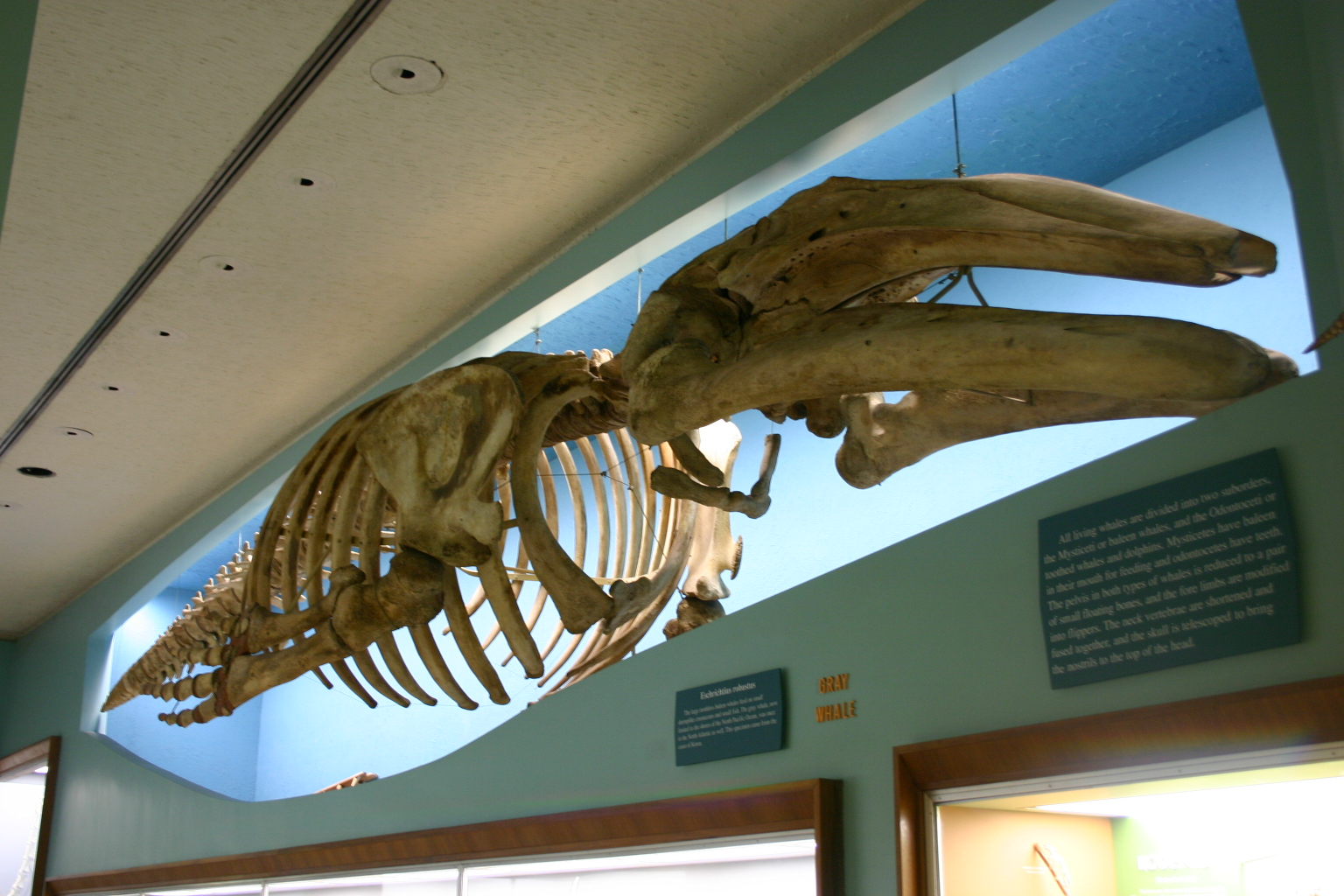
Skeleton

The gray whale is traditionally placed as the only living species in its genus and family, Eschrichtius and Eschrichtiidae, but an extinct species was discovered and placed in the genus in 2017, the Akishima whale (E. akishimaensis). Some recent studies place gray whales as being outside the rorqual clade, but as the closest relatives to the rorquals. Other recent DNA analyses have suggested that certain rorquals of the family Balaenopteridae, such as the humpback whale, Megaptera novaeangliae, and fin whale, Balaenoptera physalus, are more closely related to the gray whale than they are to some other rorquals, such as the minke whales. The American Society of Mammalogists has followed this classification.

John Edward Gray placed it in its own genus in 1865, naming it in honour of physician and zoologist Daniel Frederik Eschricht. The common name of the whale comes from its coloration. The subfossil remains of now extinct gray whales from the Atlantic coasts of England and Sweden were used by Gray to make the first scientific description of a species then surviving only in Pacific waters. The living Pacific species was described by Cope as Rhachianectes glaucus in 1869. Skeletal comparisons showed the Pacific species to be identical to the Atlantic remains in the 1930s, and Gray's naming has been generally accepted since. Although identity between the Atlantic and Pacific populations cannot be proven by anatomical data, its skeleton is distinctive and easy to distinguish from that of all other living whales.

Many other names have been ascribed to the gray whale, including desert whale, devilfish, gray back, mussel digger and rip sack. The name Eschrichtius gibbosus is sometimes seen; this is dependent on the acceptance of a 1777 description by Erxleben.

=== Taxonomic history ===
A number of 18th century authors described the gray whale as Balaena gibbosa, the "whale with six bosses", apparently based on a brief note by Dudley 1725:

The Scrag Whale is near a kin to the Fin-back, but instead of a Fin upon his Back, the Ridge of the Afterpart of his Back is cragged with half a Dozen Knobs or Nuckles; he is nearest the right Whale in Figure and for Quantity of Oil; his Bone is white, but won't split.

The gray whale was first described as a distinct species by Lilljeborg 1861 based on a subfossil found in the brackish Baltic Sea, apparently a specimen from the now extinct north Atlantic population. Lilljeborg, however, identified it as "Balaenoptera robusta", a species of rorqual. Gray 1864 realized that the rib and scapula of the specimen was different from those of any known rorquals, and therefore erected a new genus for it, Eschrichtius. Van Beneden & Gervais 1868 were convinced that the bones described by Lilljeborg could not belong to a living species but that they were similar to fossils that Van Beneden had described from the harbour of Antwerp (most of his named species are now considered nomina dubia) and therefore named the gray whale Plesiocetus robustus, reducing Lilljeborg's and Gray's names to synonyms.

Charles Melville Scammon produced one of the earliest descriptions of living Pacific gray whales, and notwithstanding that he was among the whalers who nearly drove them to extinction in the lagoons of the Baja California Peninsula, they were and still are associated with him and his description of the species. At this time, however, the extinct Atlantic population was considered a separate species (Eschrischtius robustus) from the living Pacific population (Rhachianectes glaucus).

Determining the species classification grew increasingly confusing as 19th century scientists introduced new species at an alarming rate (e.g. Eschrichtius pusillus, E. expansus, E. priscus, E. mysticetoides), often based on fragmentary specimens, and taxonomists started to use several generic and specific names interchangeably and not always correctly (e.g. Agalephus gobbosus, Balaenoptera robustus, Agalephus gibbosus). Correct classification became even more complicated in the 1930s when it was finally realised that the extinct Atlantic population was the same species as the extant Pacific population, and the new combination Eschrichtius gibbosus was proposed.

== Description ==
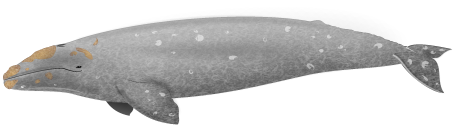

The gray whale has a dark slate-gray color and is covered by characteristic gray-white patterns, which are scars left by parasites that drop off in its cold feeding grounds. Individual whales are typically identified using photographs of their dorsal surface, matching the scars and patches associated with parasites that have either fallen off or are still attached. They have two blowholes on top of their head, which can create a distinctive heart-shaped blow at the surface in calm wind conditions.

Gray whales measure from 4.6–4.9 m (15–16 ft) in length for newborns to 11–15.2 m (36–50 ft) for adults (females tend to be slightly larger than adult males). Newborns are a darker gray to black in color. A mature gray whale can reach 40–45 tonnes (44–50 short tons), with a typical range of 15–33 t (17–36 short tons), making them the ninth largest sized species of cetacean.

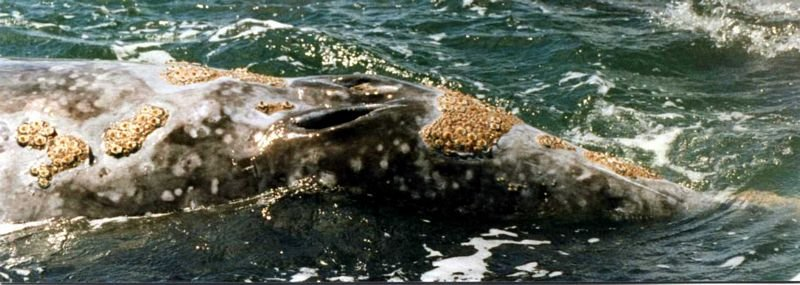
A close-up of a gray whale's double blow hole and some of its encrusted barnacles

Notable features that distinguish the gray whale from other mysticetes include its baleen that is variously described as cream, off-white, or blond in color and is unusually short. The beard plate can reach 5–40 cm (2.0–15.7 in) in length. Small depressions on the upper jaw each contain a lone stiff hair, but are only visible on close inspection. Its head's ventral surface lacks the numerous prominent furrows of the related rorquals, instead bearing two to five shallow furrows on the throat's underside. The gray whale also lacks a dorsal fin, instead bearing 6 to 12 dorsal crenulations ("knuckles"), which are raised bumps on the midline of its rear quarter, leading to the flukes. This is known as the dorsal ridge. The tail itself is 3–4 m (10–13 ft) across and deeply notched at the center while its edges taper to a point. The gray whale's penis can reach at least 1.7 m (5 ft 7 in) in length. Its movement speed is slow, about 5–8 km/h (3–5 mph), but it can reach speeds of up to 16–17.5 km/h (10–11 mph) when in danger.

There has been a record of rather aggressive interspecies interactions between a North Pacific right whale and a pod of gray whales off California, making it the only record of possible interspecies aggression among baleen whales. However, there has also been an observation of social interaction behavior between the two species on Sakhalin.

=== Pacific groups ===
The two populations of Pacific gray whales (east and west) are morphologically and phylogenically different. Other than DNA structures, differences in proportions of several body parts and body colors including skeletal features, and length ratios of flippers and baleen plates have been confirmed between Eastern and Western populations, and some claims that the original eastern and western groups could have been much more distinct than previously thought, enough to be counted as subspecies. Since the original Asian and Atlantic populations have become extinct, it is difficult to determine the unique features among whales in these stocks. However, there has been observations of some whales showing distinctive, blackish body colors in recent years. This corresponds with the DNA analysis of last recorded stranding in China. Differences were also observed between Korean and Chinese specimens.

== Populations ==
=== North Pacific ===
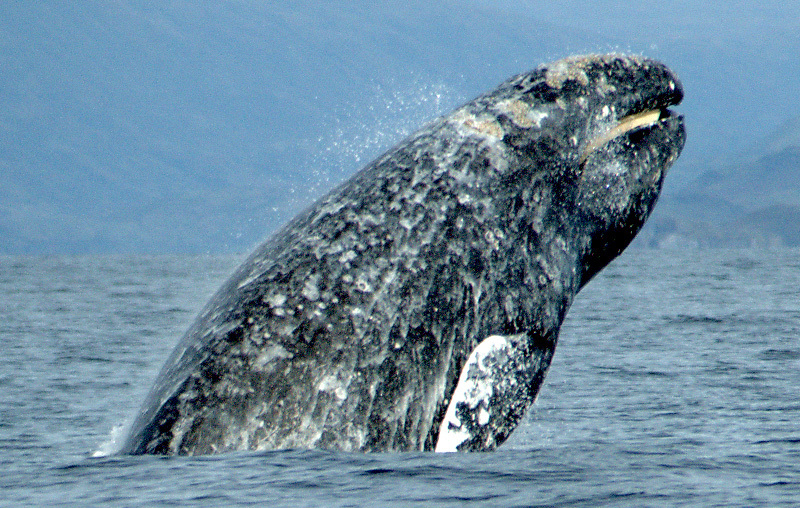
Gray whale breaching

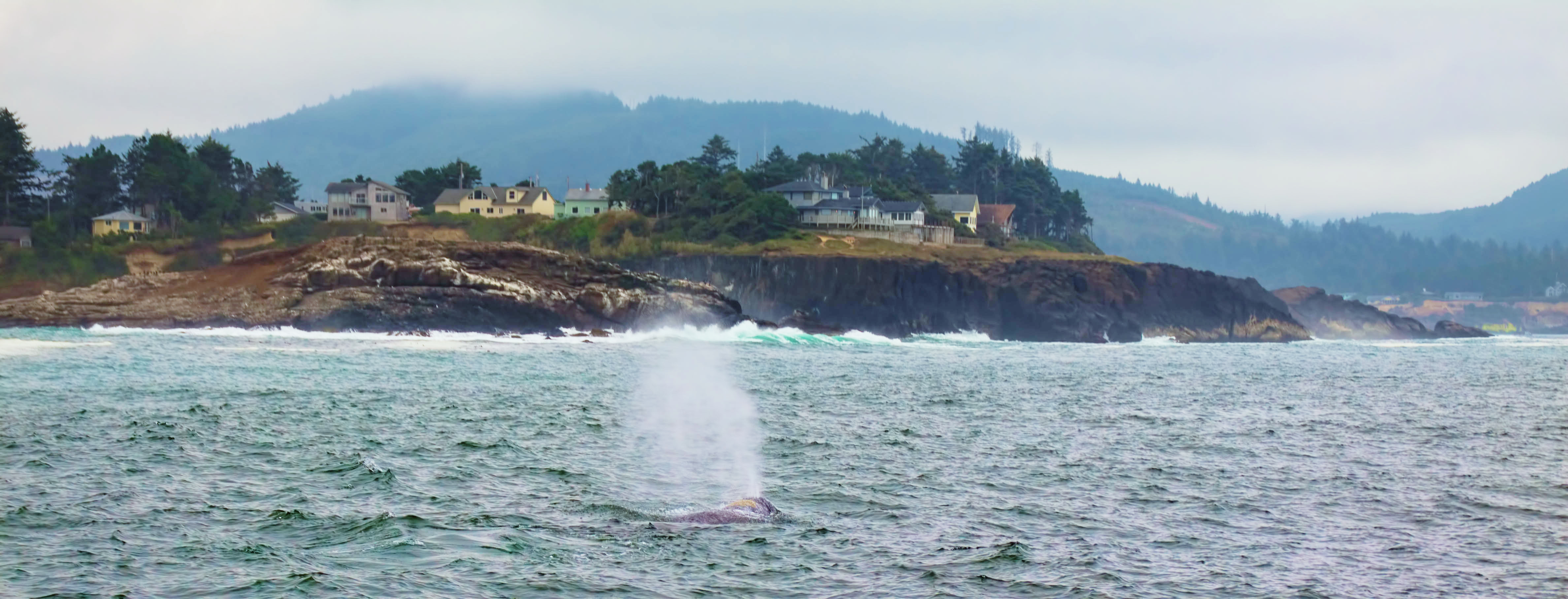
Gray whale spouting along shores of Yachats, Oregon

Two Pacific Ocean populations are known to exist: one population that is very low, whose migratory route is presumed to be between the Sea of Okhotsk and southern Korea, and a larger population numbering about 27,000 individuals in the eastern Pacific, traveling between the waters off northernmost Alaska and Baja California Sur. The population of 27,000 in 2016 had however collapsed to 13,000 by 2025, due to mass starvation, malnutrition and calving failure related to warming conditions in the Arctic breeding area; calf births have fallen by 95 %.

The western population has had a very slow growth rate despite heavy conservation action over the years, likely due to their very slow reproduction rate. The state of the population hit an all-time low in 2010. Even a very small number of additional annual female deaths will cause the subpopulation to decline. However, as of 2018, evidence has indicated that the western population is markedly increasing in number, especially off Sakhalin Island. Following this, the IUCN downlisted the population's conservation status from critically endangered to endangered.

=== North Atlantic ===
The gray whale became extinct in the North Atlantic in the 18th century. They had been seasonal migrants to coastal waters of both sides of Atlantic, including the Baltic Sea, the Wadden Sea, the Gulf of St. Lawrence, the Bay of Fundy, Pamlico Sound and possibly Hudson Bay. Radiocarbon dating of subfossil or fossil European (Belgium, the Netherlands, Sweden, the United Kingdom) coastal remains confirms this, with whaling the possible cause for the population's extinction. A 2025 study determined that gray whales became extirpated in the eastern North Atlantic around in the 12th to 14th centuries and put the cause as partly due to environmental factors as it coincided with the end of the Medieval Warm period and medieval whaling as its extirpation coincided with the height of medieval whaling. Remains dating from the Roman epoch were found in the Mediterranean during excavation of the antique harbor of Lattara near Montpellier, France, in 1997, raising the question of whether Atlantic gray whales migrated up and down the coast of Europe from the Wadden Sea to calve in the Mediterranean. A 2018 study utilizing ancient DNA barcoding and collagen peptide matrix fingerprinting confirmed that Roman era whale bones east of the Strait of Gibraltar were gray whales (and North Atlantic right whales), confirming that gray whales once ranged into the Mediterranean. Similarly, radiocarbon dating of American east coastal subfossil remains confirm that gray whales existed there at least through the 17th century. This population ranged at least from Southampton, New York, to Jupiter Island, Florida, the latest from 1675. In his 1835 history of Nantucket Island, Obed Macy wrote that in the early pre-1672 colony a whale of the kind called "scragg" entered the harbor and was pursued and killed by the settlers. A. B. Van Deinse points out that the "scrag whale", described by P. Dudley in 1725 as one of the species hunted by the early New England whalers, was almost certainly the gray whale.

Since the 2010s, there have been occasional sightings of gray whales in the Atlantic Ocean and in the Mediterranean Sea, including one off the coast of Israel and one off the coast of Namibia. These were presumably migrants from the North Pacific population through the Arctic Ocean. A 2015 study of DNA from subfossil gray whales indicated that this may not be a historically unique event. That study suggested that over the past 100,000 years there have been several migrations of gray whales between the Pacific and Atlantic, with the most recent large scale migration of this sort occurring about 5,000 years ago. These migrations corresponded to times of relatively high temperatures in the Arctic Ocean. In 2021, one individual was seen in the port of Rabat, Morocco, followed by sightings in Algeria and Italy. In March 2024, New England Aquarium researchers photographed a gray whale 30 miles (48 km) south of Nantucket, Massachusetts.

=== Pre-whaling abundance ===
Researchers used a genetic approach to estimate pre-whaling abundance based on samples from 42 gray whales, and reported DNA variability at 10 genetic loci consistent with a population size of 76,000–118,000 individuals, three to five times larger than the average census size as measured through 2007. The National Oceanic and Atmospheric Administration has collected surveys of gray whale population since at least the 1960s. They state that "the most recent population estimate [from 2007] was approximately 19,000 whales, with a high probability (88%) that the population is at 'optimum sustainable population' size, as defined by the Marine Mammal Protection Act". They speculate that the ocean ecosystem has likely changed since the pre-whaling era, making a return to pre-whaling numbers infeasible. Factors limiting or threatening current population levels include ship strikes, entanglement in fishing gear, and changes in sea-ice coverage associated with climate change.

=== Integration and recolonization ===
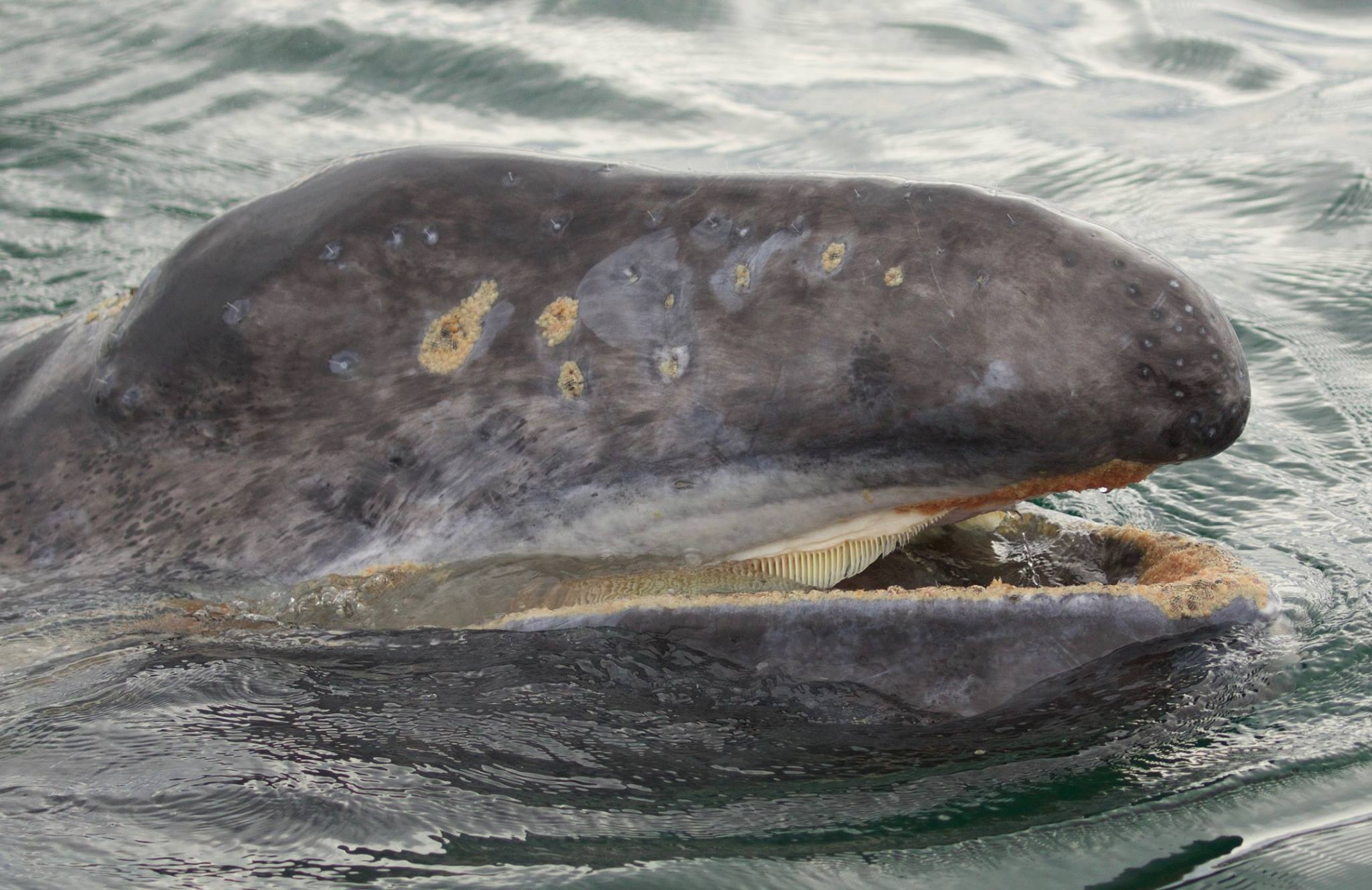
Calf with mouth open showing baleen, Alaska

Several whales seen off Sakhalin and on Kamchatka Peninsula have been confirmed to migrate towards eastern side of Pacific and join the larger eastern population. In January 2011, a gray whale that had been tagged in the western population was tracked as far east as the eastern population range off the coast of British Columbia. Recent findings from either stranded or entangled specimens indicate that the original western population have become functionally extinct, and possibly all the whales that have appeared on Japanese and Chinese coasts in modern times are vagrants or re-colonizers from the eastern population.

In mid-1980, there were three gray whale sightings in the eastern Beaufort Sea, placing them 585 kilometers (364 mi) further east than their known range at the time. Recent increases in sightings are confirmed in Arctic areas of the historic range for Atlantic stocks, most notably on several locations in the Laptev Sea including the New Siberian Islands in the East Siberian Sea, and around the marine mammal sanctuary of the Franz Josef Land, indicating possible earlier pioneers of re-colonizations. These whales were darker in body color than those whales seen in Sea of Okhotsk. In May 2010, a gray whale was sighted off the Mediterranean shore of Israel. It has been speculated that this whale crossed from the Pacific to the Atlantic via the Northwest Passage, since an alternative route around Cape Horn would not be contiguous to the whale's established territory. There has been gradual melting and recession of Arctic sea ice with extreme loss in 2007 rendering the Northwest Passage "fully navigable". The same whale was sighted again on 30 May 2010, off the coast of Barcelona, Spain.

In May 2013, a gray whale was sighted off Walvis Bay, Namibia. Scientists from the Namibian Dolphin Project confirmed the whale's identity and thus provides the only sighting of this species in the Southern Hemisphere. Photographic identification suggests that this is a different individual than the one spotted in the Mediterranean in 2010. As of July 2013, the Namibian whale was still being seen regularly.

In March 2021, a gray whale was sighted near Rabat, the capital of Morocco. In April, additional sightings were made off Algeria and Italy.

In December 2023, a gray whale was sighted off Sunny Isles Beach, Florida.

Genetic analysis of fossil and prefossil gray whale remains in the Atlantic Ocean suggests several waves of dispersal from the Pacific to the Atlantic related to successive periods of climactic warming – during the Pleistocene before the last glacial period and the early Holocene immediately following the opening of the Bering Strait. This information and the recent sightings of Pacific gray whales in the Atlantic, suggest that another range expansion to the Atlantic may be starting.

== Life history ==
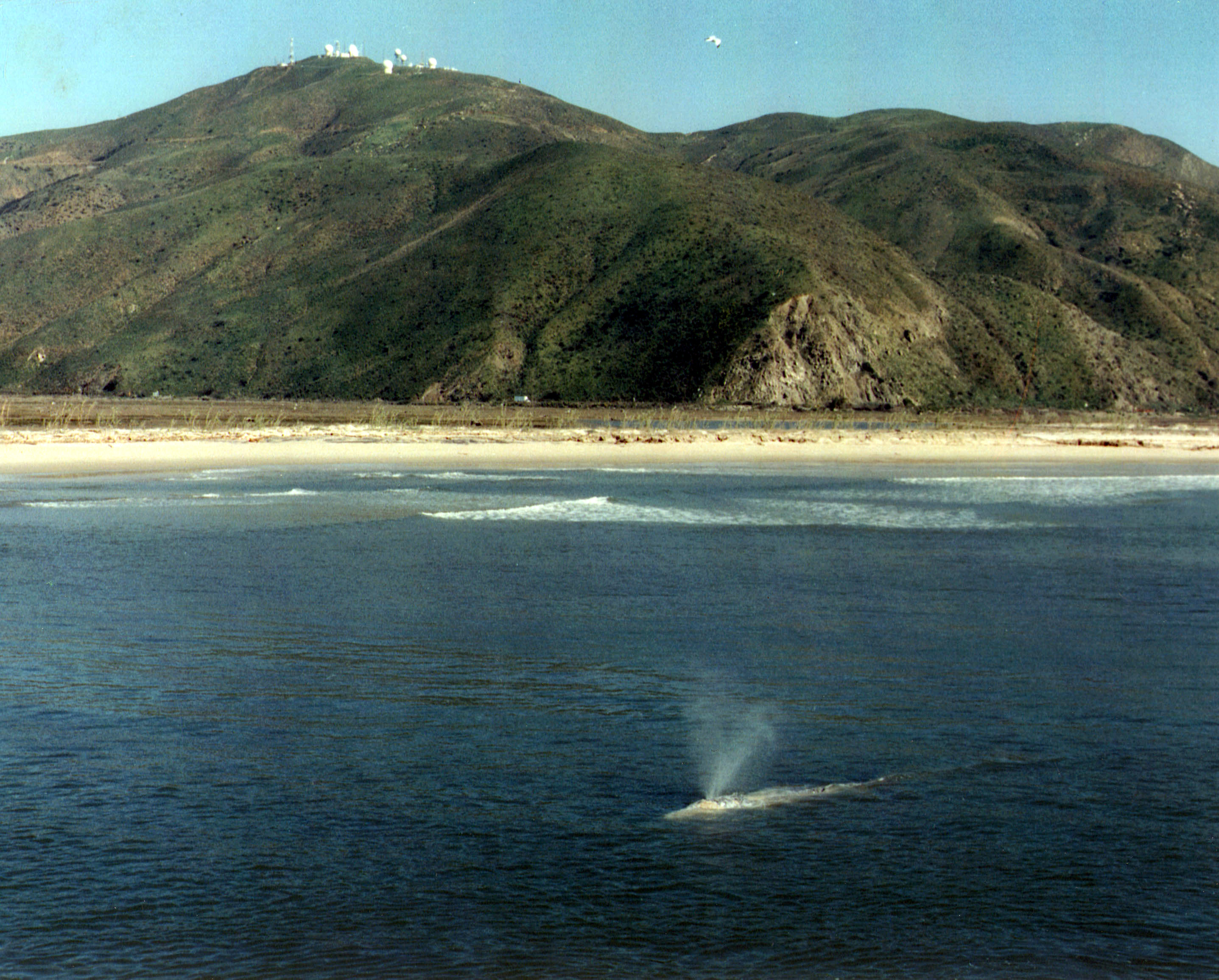
A whale swims off the coast near the Santa Monica Mountains.

=== Reproduction ===
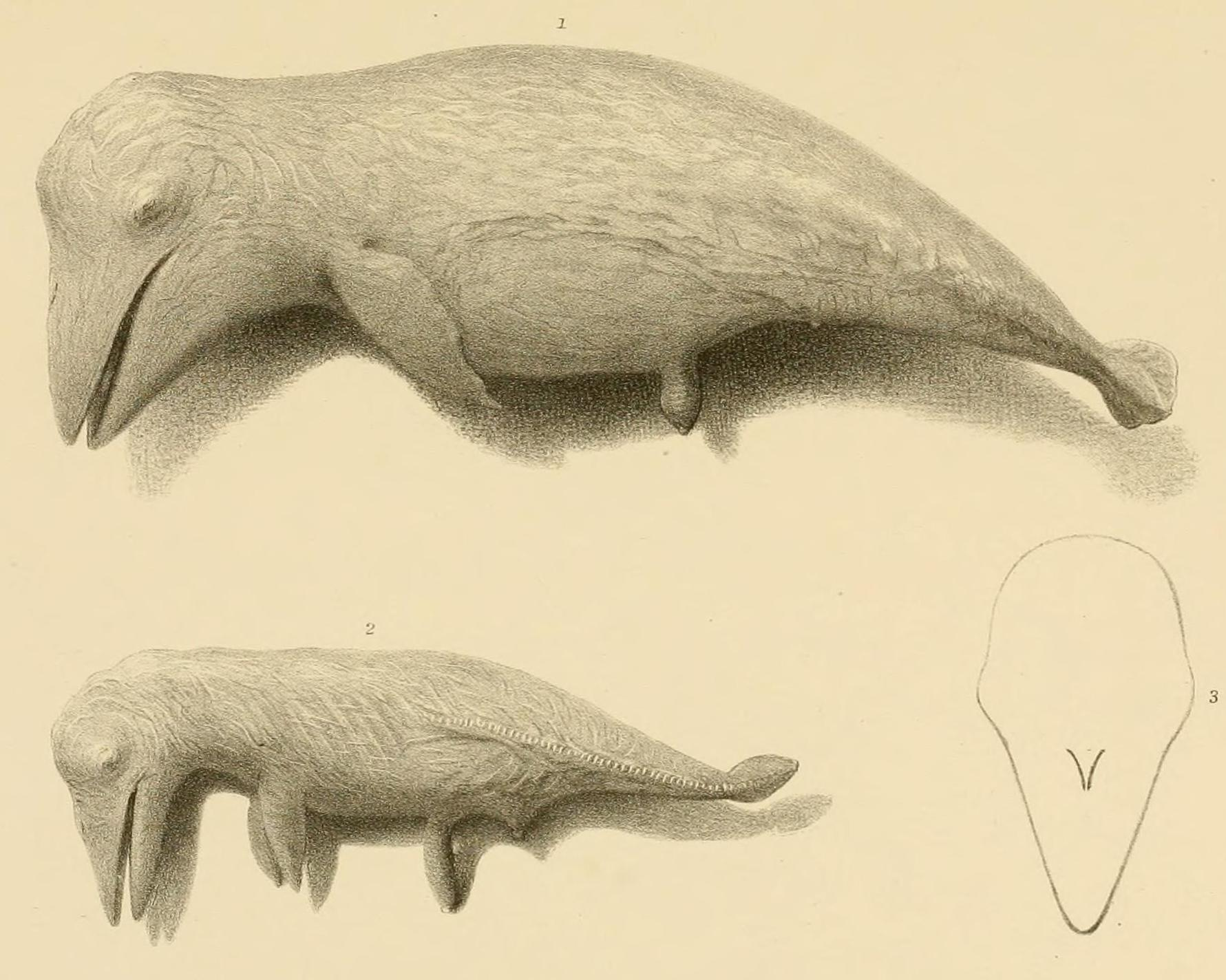
Embryos of gray whale (1874 illustration) and outline of head showing spouthole

Breeding behavior is complex and often involves three or more animals. Both male and female whales reach puberty between the ages of 6 and 12 with an average of eight to nine years. Females show highly synchronized reproduction, undergoing oestrus in late November to early December. During the breeding season, it is common for females to have several mates. This single ovulation event is believed to coincide with the species' annual migration patterns, when births can occur in warmer waters. Most females show biennial reproduction, although annual births have been reported. Males also show seasonal changes, experiencing an increase in testes mass that correlates with the time females undergo oestrus. There have been reports of males displaying aggressive behavior toward females who have given birth that year, sometimes resulting in injury or death. Currently there are no accounts of twin births, although an instance of twins in utero has been reported.

The gestation period for gray whales is approximately 13 1/2 months, with females giving birth every one to three years. In the latter half of the pregnancy, the fetus experiences a rapid growth in length and mass. Similar to the narrow breeding season, most calves are born within a six-week time period in mid January. The calf is born tail first, and measures about 4.6–4.9 m (15–16 ft) in length, and a weight of 500–600 kg (1,100–1,300 lb). Females lactate for approximately seven months following birth, at which point calves are weaned and maternal care begins to decrease. The shallow lagoon waters in which gray whales reproduce are believed to protect the newborn from sharks and orcas.

On 7 January 2014 a pair of newborn or aborted conjoined twin gray whale calves were found dead in the Laguna Ojo de Liebre (Scammon's Lagoon), off the west coast of Mexico. They were joined by their bellies.

=== Feeding ===
Gray whale breaching off the coast of Santa Barbara, California

The whale feeds mainly on benthic crustaceans (such as amphipods and ghost shrimp), which it eats by turning on its side and scooping up sediments from the sea floor. This unique feeding selection makes gray whales one of the most strongly reliant on coastal waters among baleen whales. It is classified as a baleen whale and has baleen, or whalebone, which acts like a sieve, to capture small sea animals, including amphipods taken in along with sand, water and other material. Off Vancouver Island, gray whales commonly feed on shrimp-like mysids. When mysids are abundant gray whales are present in fairly large numbers. Despite mysids being a prey of choice, gray whales are opportunistic feeders and can easily switch from feeding planktonically to benthically. When gray whales feed planktonically, they roll onto their right side while their fluke remains above the surface, or they apply the skimming method seen in other baleen whales (skimming the surface with their mouth open). This skimming behavior mainly seems to be used when gray whales are feeding on crab larvae. Other prey items include polychaete worms, herring eggs, various forms of larvae, and small fish.

Gray whales feed benthically, by diving to the ocean floor and rolling on to their side, (like blue whales, gray whales seem to favor rolling onto their right side) and suck up prey from the sea floor. Gray whales seem to favor feeding planktonically in their feeding grounds, but benthically along their migration route in shallower water. Mostly, the animal feeds in the northern waters during the summer; and opportunistically feeds during its migration, depending primarily on its extensive fat reserves. Another reason for this opportunistic feeding may be the result of population increases, resulting in the whales taking advantage of whatever prey is available, due to increased competition. Feeding areas during migration seem to include the Gulf of California, Monterey Bay and Baja California Sur. Calf gray whales drink 24–35 L (5.3–7.7 imp gal; 6.3–9.2 US gal) of their mothers' 53% fat milk per day.

Diagram of the gray whale seafloor feeding strategy

A gray whale feeding near Yaquina Head, Oregon

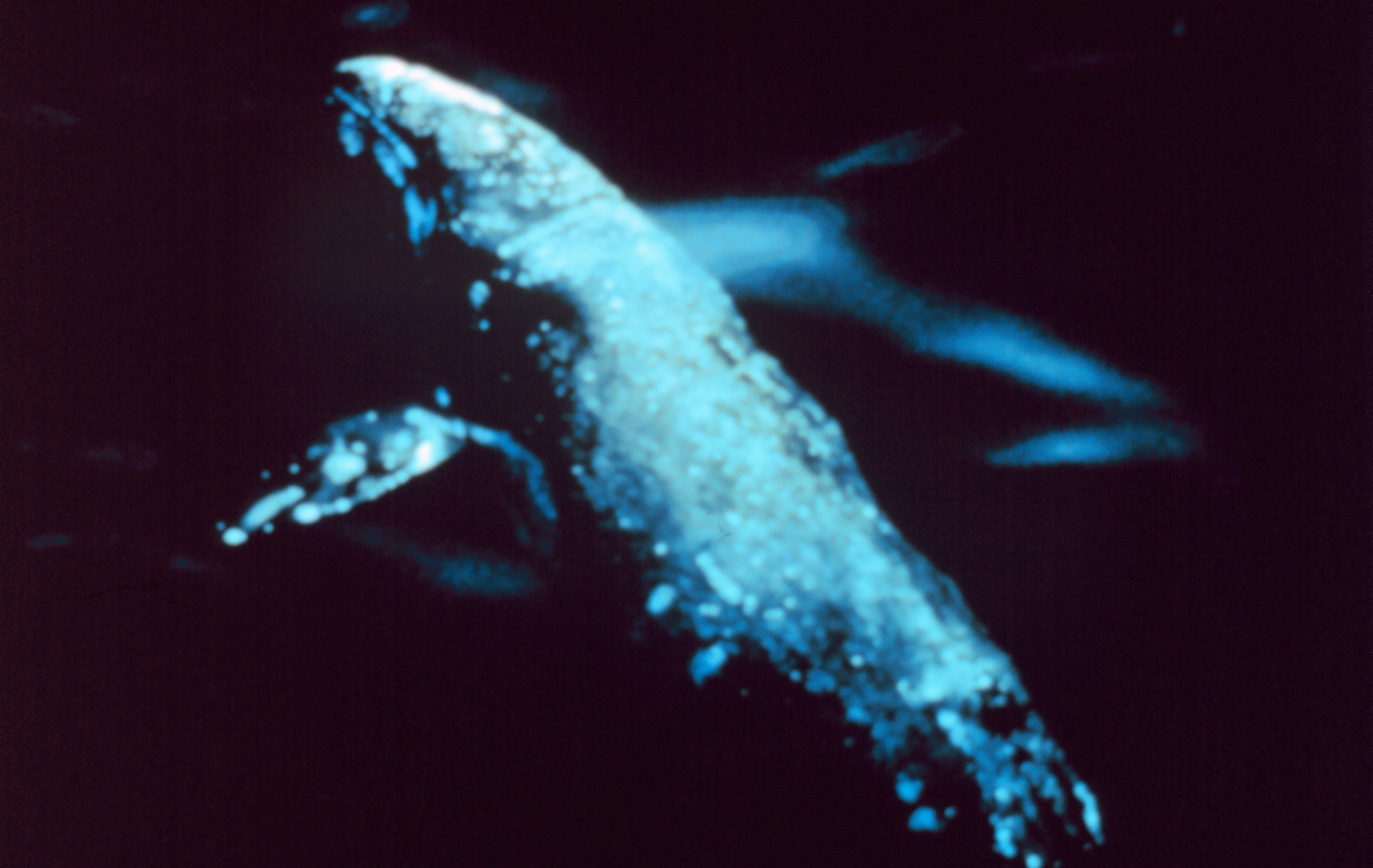
A gray whale viewed from above

=== Migration ===
Predicted distribution models indicate that overall range in the last glacial period was broader or more southerly distributed, and inhabitations in waters where species presences lack in present situation, such as in southern hemisphere and south Asian waters and northern Indian Ocean were possible due to feasibility of the environment on those days. Range expansions due to recoveries and re-colonization in the future is likely to happen and the predicted range covers wider than that of today. The gray whale undergoes the longest migration of any mammal.

==== Eastern Pacific population ====
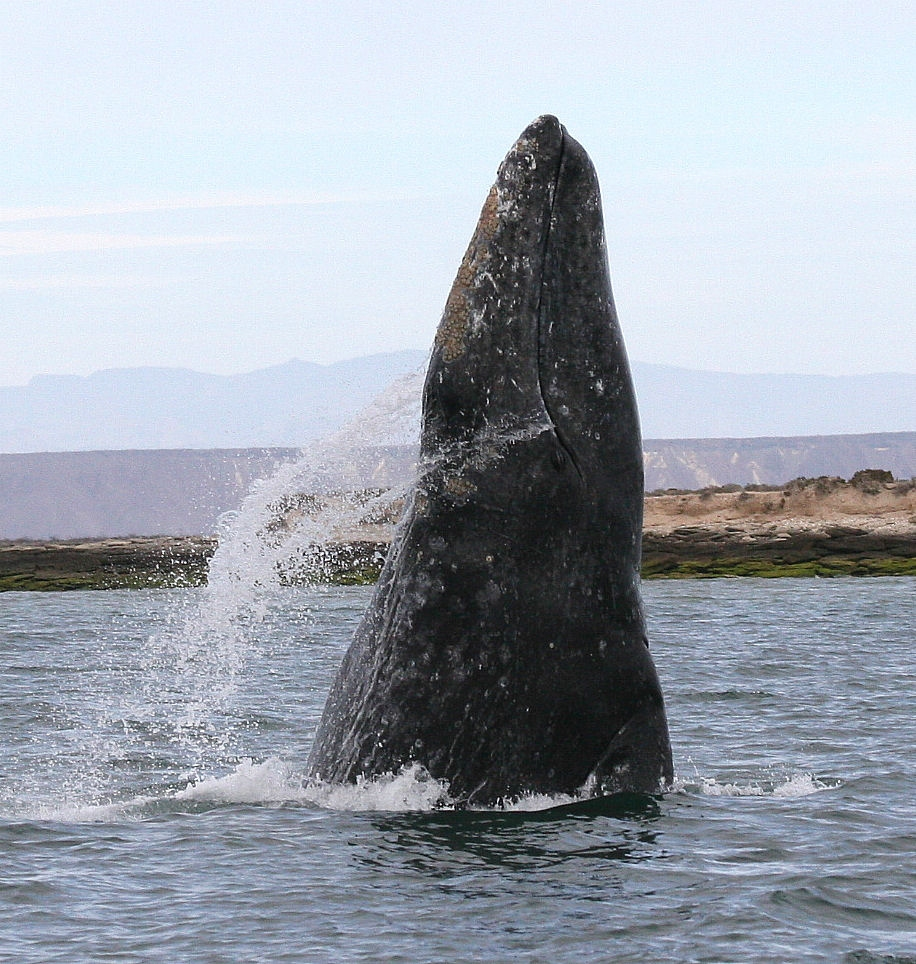
A gray whale breaching in a lagoon on the coast of Mexico

Each October, as the northern ice pushes southward, small groups of eastern gray whales in the eastern Pacific start a two- to three-month, 8,000–11,000 km (5,000–6,800 mi) trip south. Beginning in the Bering and Chukchi seas and ending in the warm-water lagoons of Mexico's Baja California Peninsula and the southern Gulf of California, they travel along the west coast of Canada, the United States and Mexico.

Traveling night and day, the gray whale averages approximately 120 km (75 mi) per day at an average speed of 8 km/h (5 mph). This round trip of 16,000–22,000 km (9,900–13,700 mi) is believed to be the longest annual migration of any mammal. By mid-December to early January, the majority are usually found between Monterey and San Diego such as at Morro bay, often visible from shore. The whale watching industry provides ecotourists and marine mammal enthusiasts the opportunity to see groups of gray whales as they migrate.

By late December to early January, eastern grays begin to arrive in the calving lagoons and bays on the west coast of Baja California Sur. The three most popular are San Ignacio, Magdalena Bay to the south, and, to the north, Laguna Ojo de Liebre (formerly known in English as Scammon's Lagoon after whaleman Charles Melville Scammon, who discovered the lagoons in the 1850s and hunted the grays).

Gray whales once ranged into Sea of Cortez and Pacific coasts of continental Mexico south to the Islas Marías, Bahía de Banderas, and Nayarit/Jalisco, and there were two modern calving grounds in Sonora (Tojahui or Yavaros) and Sinaloa (Bahia Santa Maria, Bahia Navachiste, La Reforma, Bahia Altata) until being abandoned in the 1980s.

These first whales to arrive are usually pregnant mothers looking for the protection of the lagoons to bear their calves, along with single females seeking mates. By mid-February to mid-March, the bulk of the population has arrived in the lagoons, filling them with nursing, calving and mating gray whales.

Throughout February and March, the first to leave the lagoons are males and females without new calves. Pregnant females and nursing mothers with their newborns are the last to depart, leaving only when their calves are ready for the journey, which is usually from late March to mid-April. Often, a few mothers linger with their young calves well into May. Whale watching in Baja's lagoons is particularly popular because the whales often come close enough to boats for tourists to pet them.

By late March or early April, the returning animals can be seen from Puget Sound to Canada.

===== Resident groups =====
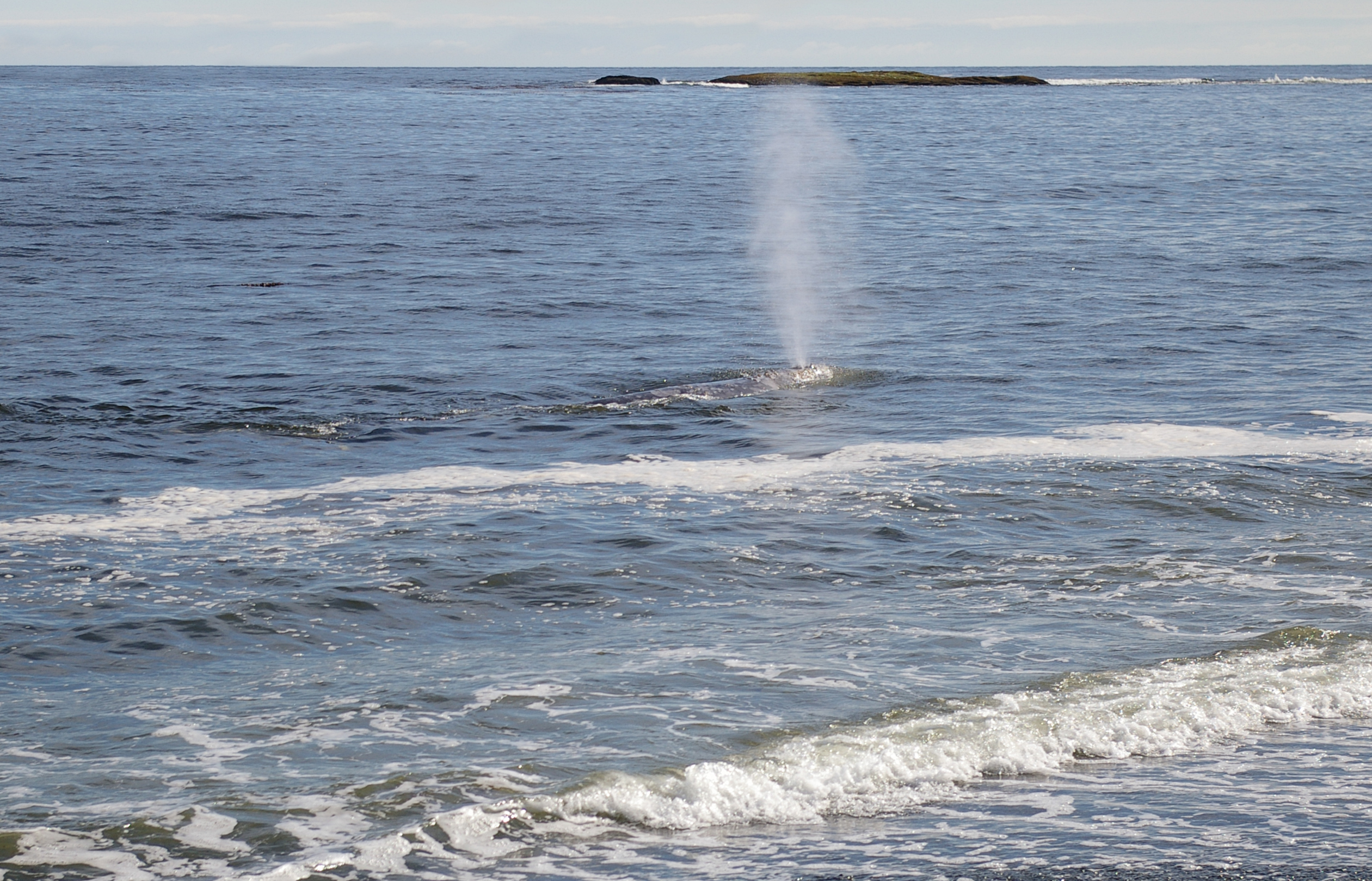
A gray whale swims near surf on Nootka Island within residential range.

A population of about 200 gray whales stay along the eastern Pacific coast from Canada to California throughout the summer, not making the farther trip to Alaskan waters. This summer resident group is known as the Pacific Coast feeding group.

Any historical or current presence of similar groups of residents among the western population is currently unknown, however, whalers' logbooks and scientific observations indicate that possible year-round occurrences in Chinese waters and Yellow and Bohai basins were likely to be summering grounds. Some of the better documented historical catches show that it was common for whales to stay for months in enclosed waters elsewhere, with known records in the Seto Inland Sea and the Gulf of Tosa. Former feeding areas were once spread over large portions on mid-Honshu to northern Hokkaido, and at least whales were recorded for majority of annual seasons including wintering periods at least along east coasts of Korean Peninsula and Yamaguchi Prefecture. Some recent observations indicate that historic presences of resident whales are possible: a group of two or three were observed feeding in Izu Ōshima in 1994 for almost a month, two single individuals stayed in Ise Bay for almost two months in the 1980s and in 2012, the first confirmed living individuals in Japanese EEZ in the Sea of Japan and the first of living cow-calf pairs since the end of whaling stayed for about three weeks on the coastline of Teradomari in 2014. One of the pair returned to the same coasts at the same time of the year in 2015 again. Reviewing on other cases on different locations among Japanese coasts and islands observed during 2015 indicate that spatial or seasonal residencies regardless of being temporal or permanental staying once occurred throughout many parts of Japan or on other coastal Asia.

==== Western population ====
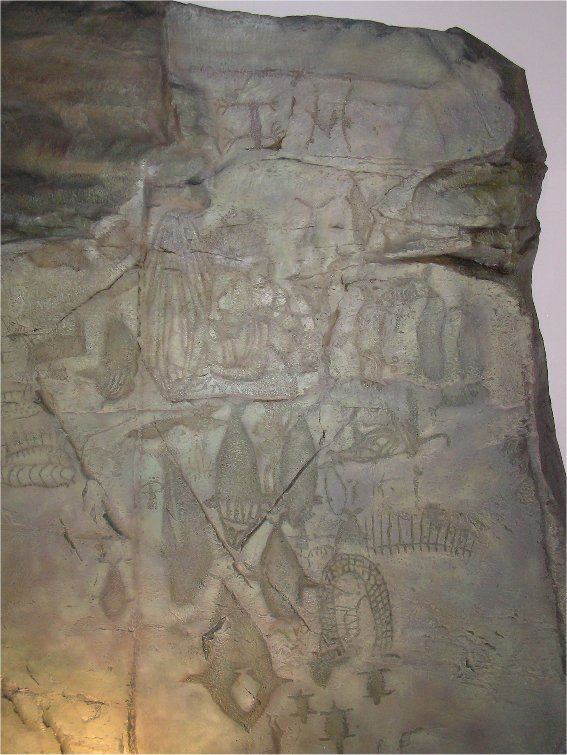
Gray and other whales were depicted on the Bangudae Petroglyphs, indicating their historical presences along Korean Peninsula.

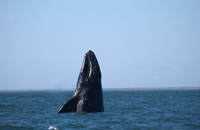
A gray whale in the water off Sakhalin Island.

Gray whale had not been observed on Commander Islands until 2016. The northwestern pacific population consists of approximately 300 individuals, based on photo identification collected off of Sakhalin Island and Kamchatka.

The Sea of Japan was once thought not to have been a migration route, until several entanglements were recorded. Any records of the species had not been confirmed since after 1921 on Kyushu. However, there were numerous records of whales along the Genkai Sea off Yamaguchi Prefecture, in Ine Bay in the Gulf of Wakasa, and in Tsushima. Gray whales, along with other species such as right whales and Baird's beaked whales, were common features off the north eastern coast of Hokkaido near Teshio, Ishikari Bay near Otaru, the Shakotan Peninsula, and islands in the La Pérouse Strait such as Rebun Island and Rishiri Island. These areas may also have included feeding grounds. There are shallow, muddy areas favorable for feeding whales off Shiretoko, such as at Shibetsu, the Notsuke Peninsula, Cape Ochiishi on Nemuro Peninsula, Mutsu Bay, along the Tottori Sand Dunes, in the Suou-nada Sea, and Ōmura Bay.

Calves might have been along southern Chinese coasts from Zhejiang and Fujian Province to Guangdong, especially south of Hailing Island and to near Hong Kong. Possibilities include Daya Bay, Wailou Harbour on Leizhou Peninsula, and possibly as far south as Hainan Province and Guangxi, particularly Hainan Island. It is unknown whether the whales' normal range once reached further south, to the Gulf of Tonkin. In addition, the existence of historical calving ground on Taiwan and Penghu Islands (with some fossil records and captures), and any presence in other areas outside of the known ranges off Babuyan Islands in Philippines and coastal Vietnamese waters in Gulf of Tonkin are unknown. There is only one confirmed record of accidentally killing of the species in Vietnam, at Ngoc Vung Island off Ha Long Bay in 1994 and the skeleton is on exhibition at the Quang Ninh Provincial Historical Museum. Gray whales are known to occur in Taiwan Strait even in recent years.

It is also unknown whether any winter breeding grounds ever existed beyond Chinese coasts. For example, it is not known if the whales visited the southern coasts of the Korean Peninsula, adjacent to the Island of Jeju, Haiyang Island, the Gulf of Shanghai, or the Zhoushan Archipelago. There is no evidence of historical presence in Japan south of Ōsumi Peninsula; only one skeleton has been discovered in Miyazaki Prefecture. Hideo Omura once considered the Seto Inland Sea to be a historical breeding ground, but only a handful of capture records support this idea, although migrations into the sea have been confirmed. Recent studies using genetics and acoustics, suggest that there are several wintering sites for western gray whales such as Mexico and the East China sea. However, their wintering ground habits in the western North Pacific are still poorly understood and additional research is needed.

==== Recent migration in Asian waters ====
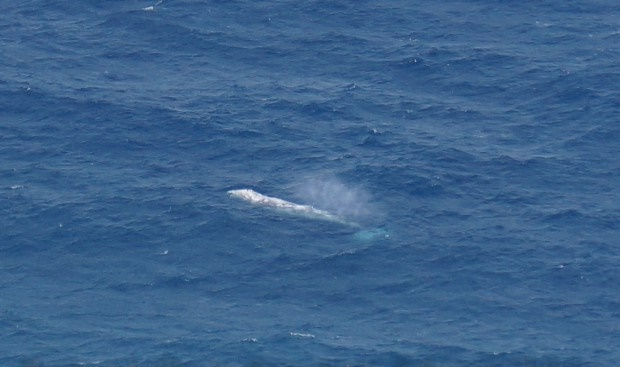
Gray whale at Aogashima, Izu Islands on 11 March 2017.

Even though South Korea put the most effort into conservation of the species among the Asian nations, there are no confirmed sightings along the Korean Peninsula or even in the Sea of Japan in recent years.

The last confirmed record in Korean waters was the sighting of a pair off Bangeojin, Ulsan in 1977. Prior to this, the last was of catches of 5 animals off Ulsan in 1966. There was a possible sighting of a whale within the port of Samcheok in 2015.

There had been 24 records along Chinese coasts including sighting, stranding, intended hunts, and bycatches since 1933. The last report of occurrence of the species in Chinese waters was of a stranded semi adult female in the Bohai Sea in 1996, and the only record in Chinese waters in the 21st century was of a fully-grown female being killed by entanglement in Pingtan, China in November 2007. DNA studies indicated that this individual might have originated from the eastern population rather than the western.

Most notable observations of living whales after the 1980s were of 17 or 18 whales along Primorsky Krai in late October 1989 (prior to this, a pair was reported swimming in the area in 1987), followed by the record of 14 whales in La Pérouse Strait on 13th, June in 1982 (in this strait, there was another sighting of a pair in October 1987). In 2011, presences of gray whales were acoustically detected among pelagic waters in East China Sea between Chinese and Japanese waters.

Since the mid-1990s, almost all the confirmed records of living animals in Asian waters were from Japanese coasts. There have been eight to fifteen sightings and stray records including unconfirmed sightings and re-sightings of the same individual, and one later killed by net-entanglement. The most notable of these observations are listed below:

- The feeding activities of a group of two or three whales that stayed around Izu Ōshima in 1994 for almost a month were recorded underwater by several researchers and whale photographers.
- A pair of thin juveniles were sighted off Kuroshio, Kōchi, a renowned town for whale-watching tourism of resident and sub-resident populations of Bryde's whales, in 1997. This sighting was unusual because of the location on mid-latitude in summer time.
- Another pair of sub-adults were confirmed swimming near the mouth of Otani River in Suruga Bay in May 2003.
- A sub-adult whale that stayed in the Ise and Mikawa Bay for nearly two months in 2012 was later confirmed to be the same individual as the small whale observed off Tahara near Cape Irago in 2010, making it the first confirmed constant migration out of Russian waters. The juvenile observed off Owase in Kumanonada Sea in 2009 might or might not be the same individual. The Ise and Mikawa Bay region is the only location along Japanese coasts that has several records since the 1980s (a mortal entanglement in 1968, above mentioned short-stay in 1982, self-freeing entanglement in 2005), and is also the location where the first commercial whaling started. Other areas with several sighting or stranding records in recent years are off the Kumanonada Sea in Wakayama, off Oshika Peninsula in Tōhoku, and on coastlines close to Tomakomai, Hokkaido.
- Possibly the first confirmed record of living animals in Japanese waters in the Sea of Japan since the end of whaling occurred on 3 April 2014 at Nodumi Beach, Teradomari, Niigata. Two individuals, measuring ten and five metres respectively, stayed near the mouth of Shinano River for three weeks. It is unknown whether this was a cow-calf pair, which would have been a first record in Asia. All of the previous modern records in the Sea of Japan were of by-catches.
- One of the above pair returned on the same beaches at the same time of a year in 2015.
- A juvenile or possibly or not with another larger individual remained in Japanese waters between January or March and May 2015. It was first confirmed occurrences of the species on remote, oceanic islands in Japan. One or more visited waters firstly on Kōzu-shima and Nii-Jima for weeks then adjacent to Miho no Matsubara and behind the Tokai University campus for several weeks. Possibly the same individual was seen off Futo as well. This later was identified as the same individual previously recorded on Sakhalin in 2014, the first re-recording one individual at different Asian locations.
- A young whale was observed by land-based fishermen at Cape Irago in March 2015.
- One of the above pair appeared in 2015 off southeastern Japan and then reappeared off Tateyama in January 2016. The identity of this whale was confirmed by Nana Takanawa who photographed the same whale on Niijima in 2015. Likely the same individual was sighted off Futo and half an hour later off Akazawa beach in Itō, Shizuoka on the 14th. The whale then stayed next to a pier on Miyake-jima and later at Habushi beach on Niijima, the same beach the same individual stayed near on the previous year.
- One whale of 9 metres (30 ft) was beached nearby Wadaura on 4 March 2016. Investigations on the corpse indicate that this was likely a different individual from the above animal.
- A 7 metres (23 ft) carcass of young female was firstly reported floating along Atami on 4 April then was washed ashore on Ito on the 6th.
- As of 20 April 2017, one or more whale(s) have been staying within Tokyo Bay since February although at one point another whale if or if not the same individual sighted off Hayama, Kanagawa. It is unclear the exact number of whales included in these sightings; two whales reported by fishermen and Japanese coastal guard reported three whales on 20th or 21st.

== Whaling ==
=== North Pacific ===
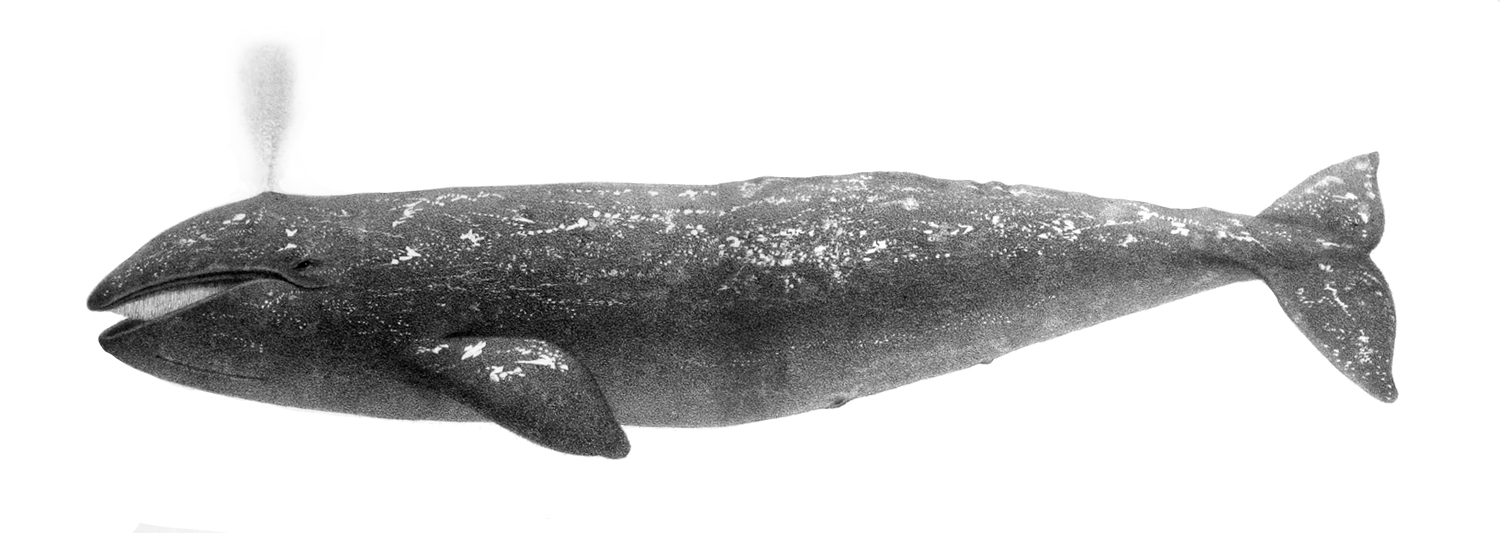
Charles Melville Scammon's 1874 illustration of a gray whale

==== Eastern population ====
Humans and orcas are the adult gray whale's only predators, although orcas are the more prominent predator. The carcass of a 14 m (46 ft) long adult female Gray whale, believed to have been eaten by an orca, was once found. Aboriginal hunters, including those on Vancouver Island and the Makah in Washington, have hunted gray whales.

Commercial whaling of the species by Europeans in the North Pacific began in the winter of 1845–46, when two United States ships, the Hibernia and the United States, under Captains Smith and Stevens, caught 32 in Magdalena Bay. More ships followed in the two following winters, after which gray whaling in the bay was nearly abandoned because "of the inferior quality and low price of the dark-colored gray whale oil, the low quality and quantity of whalebone from the gray, and the dangers of lagoon whaling".

Gray whaling in Magdalena Bay was revived in the winter of 1855–56 by several vessels, mainly from San Francisco, including the ship Leonore, under Captain Charles Melville Scammon. This was the first of 11 winters from 1855 through 1865 known as the "bonanza period", during which gray whaling along the coast of Baja California reached its peak. Not only were the whales taken in Magdalena Bay, but also by ships anchored along the coast from San Diego south to Cabo San Lucas and from whaling stations from Crescent City in northern California south to San Ignacio Lagoon. During the same period, vessels targeting right and bowhead whales in the Gulf of Alaska, Sea of Okhotsk, and the Western Arctic would take the odd gray whale if neither of the more desirable two species were in sight.

In December 1857, Charles Scammon, in the brig Boston, along with his schooner-tender Marin, entered Laguna Ojo de Liebre (Jack-Rabbit Spring Lagoon) or later known as Scammon's Lagoon (by 1860) and found one of the gray's last refuges. He caught 20 whales. He returned the following winter (1858–59) with the bark Ocean Bird and schooner tenders A.M. Simpson and Kate. In three months, he caught 47 cows, yielding 1,700 barrels (270 m^{3}) of oil. In the winter of 1859–60, Scammon, again in the bark Ocean Bird, along with several other vessels, entered San Ignacio Lagoon to the south where he discovered the last breeding lagoon. Within only a couple of seasons, the lagoon was nearly devoid of whales.

Between 1846 and 1874, an estimated 8,000 gray whales were killed by American and European whalemen, with over half having been killed in the Magdalena Bay complex (Estero Santo Domingo, Magdalena Bay itself, and Almejas Bay) and by shore whalemen in California and Baja California.

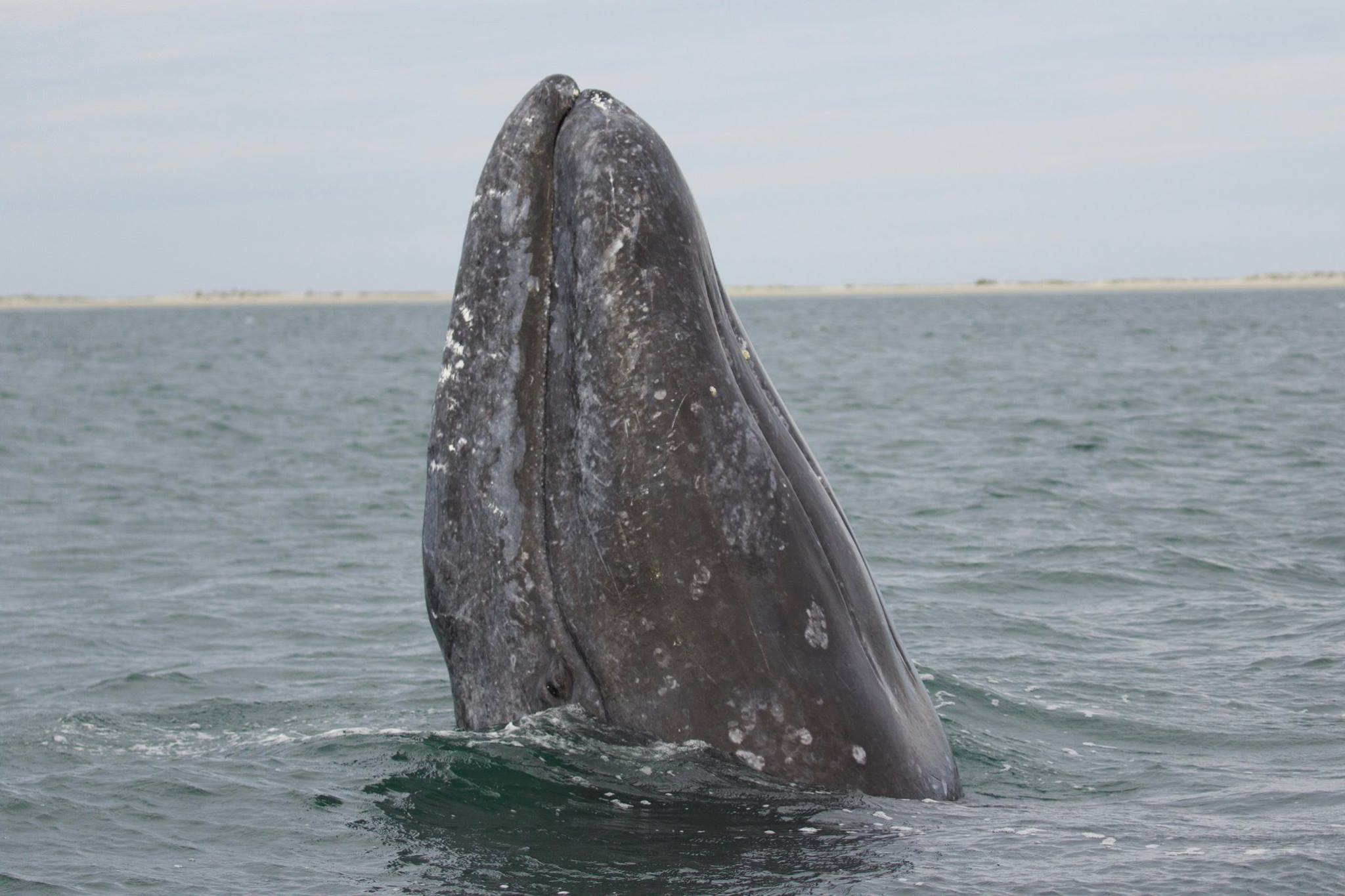
Spyhopping off the Alaskan coast

A second, shorter, and less intensive hunt occurred for gray whales in the eastern North Pacific. Only a few were caught from two whaling stations on the coast of California from 1919 to 1926, and a single station in Washington (1911–21) accounted for the capture of another. For the entire west coast of North America for the years 1919 to 1929, 234 gray whales were caught. Only a dozen or so were taken by British Columbian stations, nearly all of them in 1953 at Coal Harbour. A whaling station in Richmond, California, caught 311 gray whales for "scientific purposes" between 1964 and 1969. From 1961 to 1972, the Soviet Union caught 138 gray whales (they originally reported not having taken any). The only other significant catch was made in two seasons by the steam-schooner California off Malibu, California. In the winters of 1934–35 and 1935–36, the California anchored off Point Dume in Paradise Cove, processing gray whales. In 1936, gray whales became protected in the United States.

==== Western population ====
The Japanese began to catch gray whales beginning in the 1570s. At Kawajiri, Nagato, 169 gray whales were caught between 1698 and 1889. At Tsuro, Shikoku, 201 were taken between 1849 and 1896. Several hundred more were probably caught by American and European whalemen in the Sea of Okhotsk from the 1840s to the early 20th century. Whalemen caught 44 with nets in Japan during the 1890s. The real damage was done between 1911 and 1933, when Japanese whalemen killed 1,449 after Japanese companies established several whaling stations on Korean Peninsula and on Chinese coast such as near the Daya bay and on Hainan Island. By 1934, the western gray whale was near extinction. From 1891 to 1966, an estimated 1,800–2,000 gray whales were caught, with peak catches of between 100 and 200 annually occurring in the 1910s.

As of 2001, the Californian gray whale population had grown to about 26,000. As of 2016, the population of western Pacific (seas near Korea, Japan, and Kamchatka) gray whales was an estimated 200.

=== North Atlantic ===
The North Atlantic population may have been hunted to extinction in the 18th century. Circumstantial evidence indicates whaling could have contributed to this population's decline, as the increase in whaling activity in the 17th and 18th centuries coincided with the population's disappearance. A. B. Van Deinse points out the "scrag whale", described by P. Dudley in 1725, as one target of early New England whalers, was almost certainly the gray whale. In his 1835 history of Nantucket Island, Obed Macy wrote that in the early pre-1672 colony, a whale of the kind called "scragg" entered the harbor and was pursued and killed by the settlers. Gray whales (Icelandic sandlægja) were described in Iceland in the early 17th century. It is thought to have been hunted to extinction in the eastern North Atlantic in the 12th to 14th centuries with it being the second most common whale taxa found at archaeological sites in Europe up to the medieval period. Formations of commercial whaling among the Mediterranean basin(s) have been considered to be feasible as well.

== Conservation ==
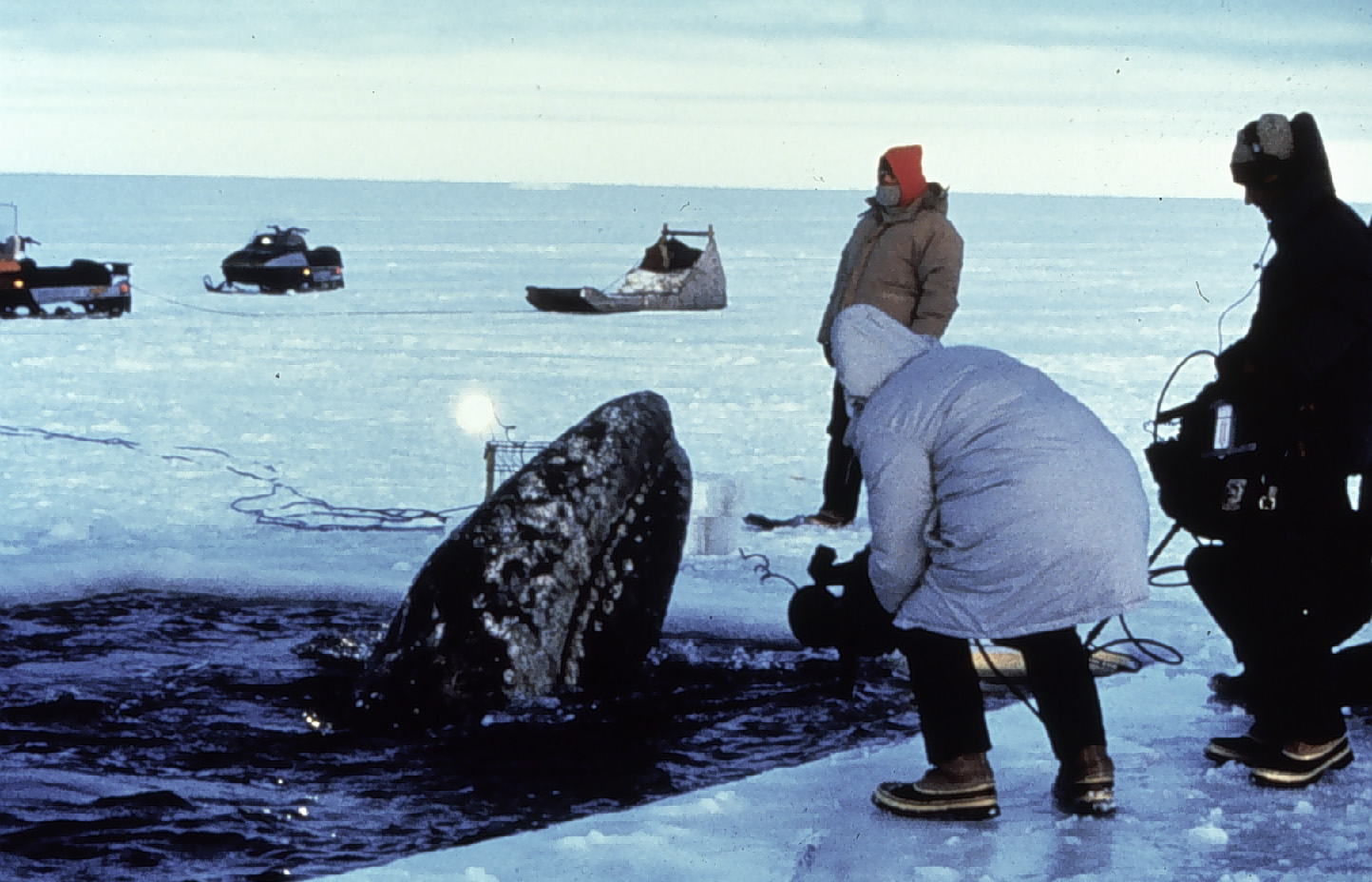
Joint US-Soviet freeing effort of whales entrapped by ice floe in Beaufort Sea as part of Operation Breakthrough.

Gray whales have been granted protection from commercial hunting by the International Whaling Commission (IWC) since 1949, and are no longer hunted on a large scale.

Limited hunting of gray whales has continued since that time, however, primarily in the Chukotka region of northeastern Russia, where large numbers of gray whales spend the summer months. This hunt has been allowed under an "aboriginal/subsistence whaling" exception to the commercial-hunting ban. Anti-whaling groups have protested the hunt, saying the meat from the whales is not for traditional native consumption, but is used instead to feed animals in government-run fur farms; they cite annual catch numbers that rose dramatically during the 1940s, at the time when state-run fur farms were being established in the region. Although the Soviet government denied these charges as recently as 1987, in recent years the Russian government has acknowledged the practice. The Russian IWC delegation has said that the hunt is justified under the aboriginal/subsistence exemption, since the fur farms provide a necessary economic base for the region's native population.

Currently, the annual quota for the gray whale catch in the region is 140 per year. Pursuant to an agreement between the United States and Russia, the Makah tribe of Washington claimed four whales from the IWC quota established at the 1997 meeting. With the exception of a single gray whale killed in 1999, the Makah people have been prevented from hunting by a series of legal challenges, culminating in a United States federal appeals court decision in December 2002 that required the National Marine Fisheries Service to prepare an Environmental Impact Statement. On 8 September 2007 five members of the Makah tribe shot a gray whale using high-powered rifles in spite of the decision. The whale died within 12 hours, sinking while heading out to sea.

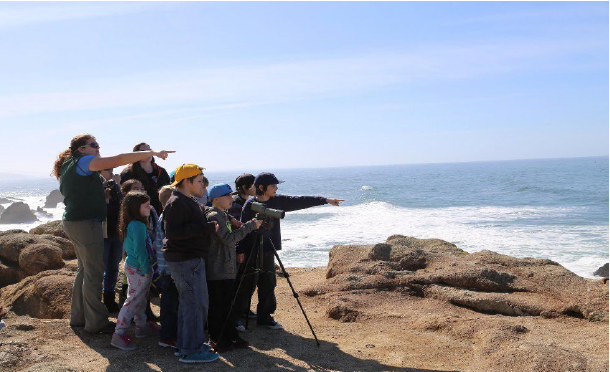
A school class in California spots a gray whale in the Cordell Bank National Marine Sanctuary during a field trip for the Every Kid in a Park program in 2016.

As of 2018, the IUCN regards the gray whale as being of least concern from a conservation perspective. However, the specific subpopulation in the northwest Pacific is regarded as being critically endangered. The northwest Pacific population is also listed as endangered by the U.S. government's National Marine Fisheries Service under the U.S. Endangered Species Act.

Gray whale migrations off of the Pacific Coast were observed, initially, by Marineland of the Pacific in Palos Verdes, California. The Gray Whale Census, an official gray whale migration census that has been recording data on the migration of the Pacific gray whale has been keeping track of the population of the Pacific gray whale since 1985. This census is the longest running census of the Pacific gray whale. Census keepers volunteer from December 1 through May, from sun up to sun down, seven days a week, keeping track of the number of gray whales migrating through the area off of Los Angeles. Information from this census is listed through the American Cetacean Society of Los Angeles (ACSLA).

South Korea and China list gray whales as protected species of high concern. In South Korea, the Gray Whale Migration Site was registered as the 126th national monument in 1962, although illegal hunts have taken place thereafter, and there have been no recent sightings of the species in Korean waters.

=== Rewilding proposal ===
In 2005, two conservation biologists proposed a plan to airlift 50 gray whales from the Pacific Ocean to the Atlantic Ocean. They reasoned that, as Californian gray whales had replenished to a suitable population, surplus whales could be transported to repopulate the extinct British population. As of 2024 this plan has not been undertaken.

== Threats ==
According to the Government of Canada's Management Plan for gray whales, threats to the eastern North Pacific population of gray whales include: increased human activities in their breeding lagoons in Mexico, climate change, acute noise, toxic spills, aboriginal whaling, entanglement with fishing gear, boat collisions, and possible impacts from fossil fuel exploration and extraction. The western gray whale population is considered to be endangered according to IUCN standards.

Along Japanese coasts, four females including a cow-calf pair were trapped and killed in nets in the 2000s. There had been a record of dead whale thought to be harpooned by dolphin-hunters found on Hokkaido in the 1990s. Meats for sale were also discovered in Japanese markets as well.

2019 has had a record number of gray whale strandings and deaths, with 122 strandings in United States waters and 214 in Canadian waters. The cause of death in some specimens appears to be related to poor nutritional condition. It is hypothesized that some of these strandings are related to changes in prey abundance or quality in the Arctic feeding grounds, resulting in poor feeding. Some scientists suggest that the lack of sea ice has been preventing the fertilization of amphipods, a main source of food for gray whales, so that they have been hunting krill instead, which is far less nutritious. More research needs to be conducted to understand this issue. These strandings ceased in 2023, but continued mortality events have effected the species. Between 2020 and 2025, gray whale populations collapsed by up to 35%. 187 gray whales had were found dead from January to August 2026, the majority having died of starvation.

A recent study provides some evidence that solar activity is correlated to gray whale strandings. When there was a high prevalence of sunspots, gray whales were five times more likely to strand. A possible explanation for this phenomenon is that solar storms release a large amount of electromagnetic radiation, which disrupts Earth's magnetic field and/or the whale's ability to analyze it. This may apply to the other species of cetaceans, such as sperm whales. However, there is not enough evidence to suggest that whales navigate through the use of magnetoreception (an organism's ability to sense a magnetic field).

Orcas are "a prime predator of gray whale calves". Typically three to four orcas ram a calf from beneath in order to separate it from its mother, who defends it. Humpback whales have been observed defending gray whale calves from orcas. Orcas will often arrive in Monterey Bay to intercept gray whales during their northbound migration, targeting females migrating with newborn calves. They will separate the calf from the mother and hold the calf under water to drown it. The tactic of holding whales under water to drown them is certainly used by orcas on adult gray whales as well. It is roughly estimated that 33% of the gray whales born in a given year might be killed by predation.

== Captivity ==
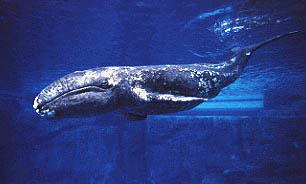
A gray whale in captivity

Because of their size and need to migrate, gray whales have rarely been held in captivity, and then only for brief periods of time. The first captive gray whale, who was captured in Scammon's Lagoon, Baja California in 1965, was named Gigi and died two months later from an infection. The second gray whale, who was captured in 1972 from the same lagoon, was named Gigi II and was released a year later after becoming too large for the facilities. The third gray whale, J.J., first beached herself in 1997 in Marina del Rey, California where she was rushed to SeaWorld San Diego. After 14 months, she was released because she also grew too large to be cared for in the existing facilities. At 19,200 pounds (8,700 kg) and 31 feet (9.4 m) when she was released, J.J. was the largest marine mammal ever to be kept in captivity.

== See also ==
- Gray Whale Cove State Beach
- Gray Whale Ranch
- List of cetaceans
- Cryptolepas rhachianecti (barnacle that lives on gray whales)
