= Charles Melville Scammon =

American whaleman, naturalist, and author

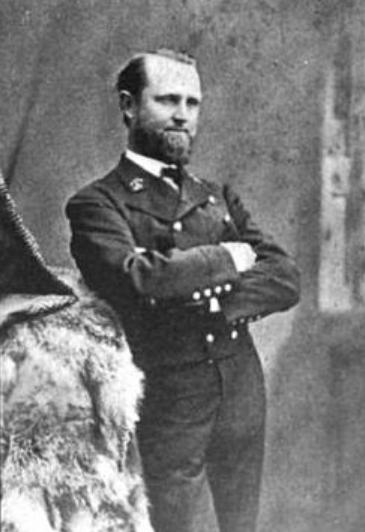
Capt. Charles M Scammon, Scientist Overland Monthly

Charles Melville Scammon (1825–1911) was a 19th-century whaleman, naturalist, and author. He was the first to hunt the gray whales of both Laguna Ojo de Liebre and San Ignacio Lagoon, the former also known as "Scammon's Lagoon" after him. In 1874 he wrote the book The Marine Mammals of the North-western Coast of North America, which was a financial failure. It is now considered a classic.

Scammon was born in Pittston, Maine, on May 28, 1825. In 1850 he sailed for California. On April 1, 1852, he left San Francisco in command of the brig Mary Helen (160 tons) on a combined sealing and whaling voyage. He returned on August 26 with 350 barrels of oil obtained from elephant seals. During the winter of 1855–56 he was among the vessels hunting gray whales in Magdalena Bay, when he was commanding the ship Leonore. In December 1857, commanding the brig Boston, with the schooner tender Marin, he first hunted the gray whales of Laguna Ojo de Liebre, catching twenty. The following winter (1858–59), commanding the bark Ocean Bird and accompanied by the schooner tenders A.M. Simpson and Kate, he returned to the lagoon, catching forty-seven cows. In the winter of 1859–60 he first exploited another lagoon to the south, San Ignacio. Within a few seasons it had been swept clean of whales.

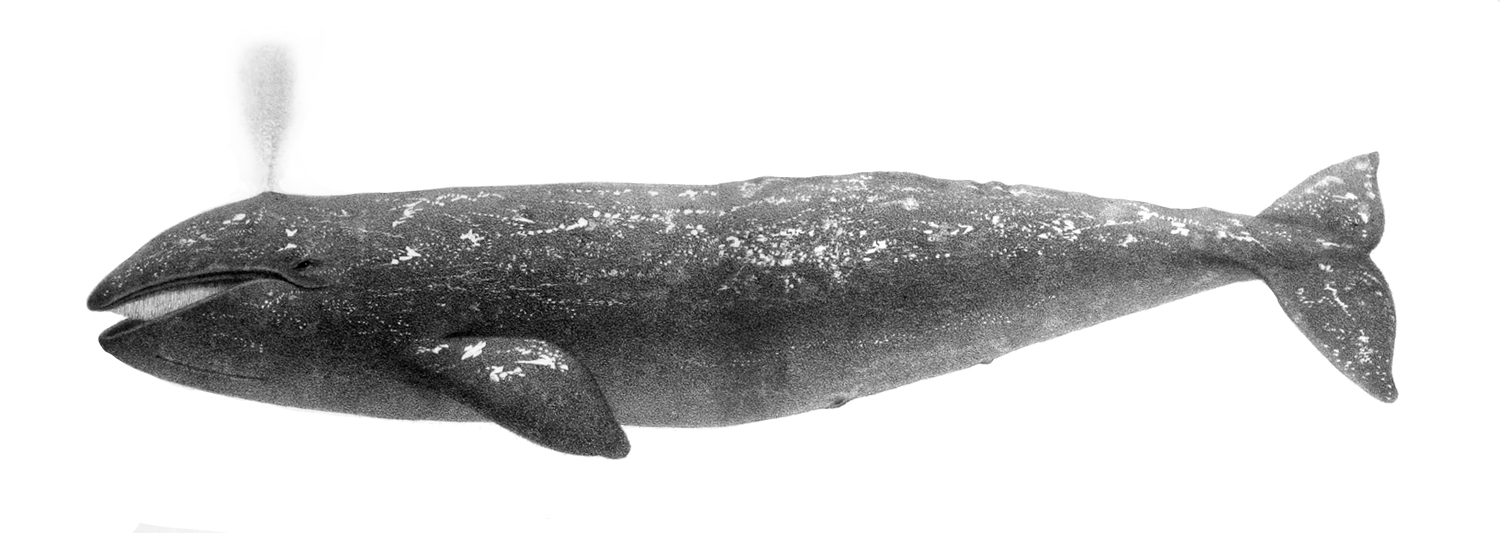
Scammon's 1874 illustration of a gray whale.

In 1860–61 he returned to Laguna Ojo de Liebre in the bark Ocean Bird, taking a paltry 245 barrels of oil: about seven whales. In the summer of 1862 he sailed to the Sea of Okhotsk in the San Francisco ship William C. Nye. He cruised around Iony Island and Shantar Bay until September, catching only three bowhead whales. In the winter of 1862–63 he hunted gray whales in Magdalena Bay, his last whaling cruise. He spent the following three decades in the Revenue Service, before retiring due to disability in 1895.

In October 1870, Scammon collected the 27-foot-long type specimen of the Davidson piked whale (Balaenoptera davidsoni, Scammon, 1872); it had been found dead on the shores of Admiralty Inlet by Italian fishermen, who towed it to Port Townsend Bay, where they flensed it.

He is the brother of J. Young Scammon and Eliakim P. Scammon.

The village of Scammon Bay, Alaska, is named after Scammon, as is a popular salmon dish in the town.
