= Ulsan Gray Whale Migration Site =

Natural monument in Ulsan, South Korea

Ulsan Gray Whale Migration Site is a natural monument located in Ulsan, South Korea. It was given National Natural Monument status on December 3, 1962. Each year, from the month of April until mid June, whales pass through Ulsan Gray Whale Migration Site, 20-30 kilometres from the Ulsan coast. It is a popular whale watching destination. Ulsan Whale Festival is hosted in the month of April each year.

== See also ==
- Gray whale
- Whale migration
