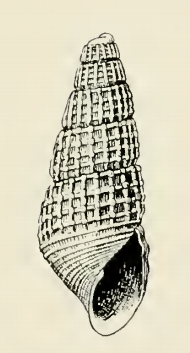
- Apertural view of a shell of Odostomia talama

Scientific classification
- Kingdom: Animalia
- Phylum: Mollusca
- Class: Gastropoda
- Family: Pyramidellidae
- Genus: Odostomia
- Species: O. talama

Binomial name
- Odostomia talama Dall & Bartsch, 1909

Synonyms
- Chrysallida talama (Dall & Bartsch, 1909); Odostomia (Chrysallida) talama Dall & Bartsch, 1909

= Odostomia talama =

Species of gastropod

Odostomia talama is a species of sea snail, a marine gastropod mollusc in the family Pyramidellidae, the pyrams and their allies.

== Description ==
The vitreous shell has a conic shape. Its length measures 3.4 mm. The whorls of the protoconch are small, smooth, obliquely deeply immersed in the first of the succeeding turns, above which only the tilted edge of the last volution projects. The six whorls of the teleoconch are flattened, strongly contracted at the periphery and moderately shouldered at the summit. They are marked by moderately strong, almost vertical, axial ribs, of which 16 occur upon the second and third, 18 upon the fourth, 20 upon the fifth, and 22 upon the penultimate turn. In addition to the axial ribs, the whorls are marked by four slender spiral cords between the sutures, the junction of which, with the axial ribs, renders them feebly nodulous. The spaces enclosed by the ribs and cords are well impressed squarish pits. The sutures are strongly channeled. The periphery is marked by a slender spiral cord, on the posterior edge of which the axial ribs terminate. The base of the body whorl is well rounded, and slightly attenuated anteriorly. It is marked by twelve spiral cords which grow successively weaker from the periphery to the umbilical area. The aperture is oval. The posterior angle is acute. The outer lip is thin, showing the external sculpture within, rendered sinuous by the spiral cords. The columella is slender, slightly reflected and reinforced by the base. It is provided with a slender fold at its insertion.

== Distribution ==
The type specimen was found in the Pacific Ocean off Scammon Lagoon, Baja California Peninsula.
