= San Ignacio Lagoon =

Bay in Baja California Sur, Mexico

Coordinates: 26°54′N 113°13′W

Designations

Ramsar Wetland
- Official name: Laguna San Ignacio
- Designated: 2 February 2004
- Reference no.: 1341

San Ignacio Lagoon (Spanish: Laguna San Ignacio) is a lagoon located in Mulegé Municipality of the Mexican state of Baja California Sur, 59 kilometers (37 mi) from San Ignacio, Mexico, and Highway 1. It is one of the winter sanctuaries of the eastern Pacific gray whale (Eschrichtius robustus).

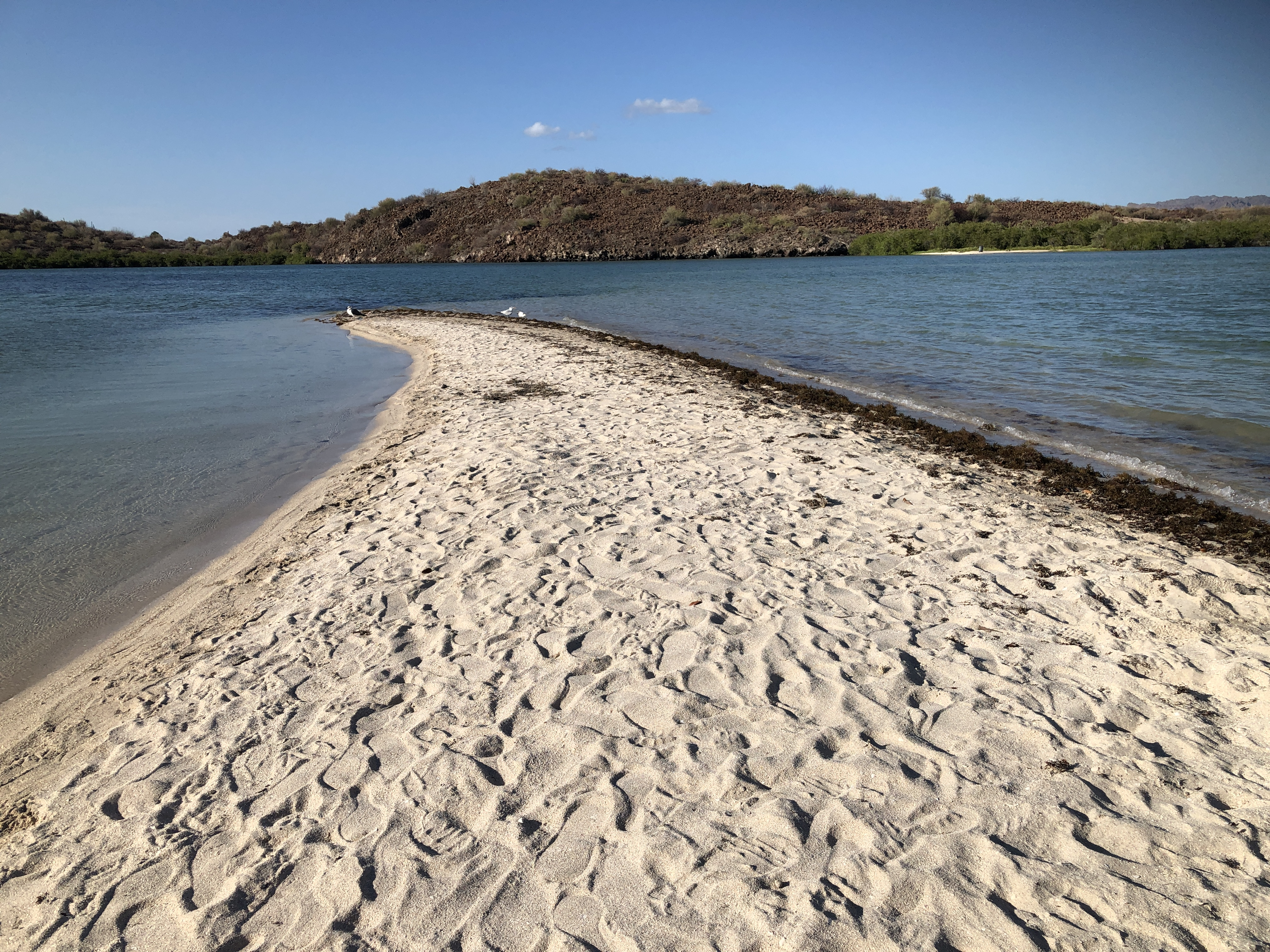
San Ignacio Lagoon

== History ==
After the native population of Baja California had vanished due to disease in the 18th century, San Ignacio Lagoon was rediscovered in the 19th century by whaling captain, Jared Poole, brother-in-law to whaling captain Charles Melville Scammon. Scammon visited the lagoon in 1860 with six whaling vessels, and the subsequent extensive whaling contributed to the near extinction of the Pacific gray whale. Today, the lagoon is a primary destination for migrating whales, and a UNESCO World Heritage Site where the whales can breed and calve their young undisturbed by humans. This lagoon is also a United Nations Biosphere Reserve and a migratory bird sanctuary.

== Grey Whales in the San Ignacio Lagoon ==
With a local community of fewer than 100 inhabitants, residents depend upon fishing and money provided from whale watching as their primary means of support. The lagoon stretches sixteen miles into the desert and has a maximum width of five miles. The lagoon is divided into three sections: the upper lagoon is the shallowest and is the birthing area where pregnant female whales bear their young; the central lagoon is the corridor where mothers travel with their newborn calves to the lower lagoon; and the lower lagoon where most of the cetaceans reside, and where the majority of the social behavior occurs. Here, males and females congregate looking for mates and newborn calves prepare themselves for the long journey north to their summer feeding grounds in the Arctic.

== San Ignacio Lagoon's significance to the world community ==
In 1988, Mexico established the El Vizcaíno Biosphere Reserve to include San Ignacio Lagoon, which is Latin America's largest wildlife sanctuary. Not only is San Ignacio Lagoon a gray whale sanctuary, but it is also one of only two undeveloped nurseries and breeding grounds of the Pacific gray whale worldwide. The other one is just 4 hours away, in Magdalena Bay. San Ignacio Lagoon is also the critical habitat for the berrendo or pronghorn antelope, a species that is endangered in Mexico, and an important feeding habitat for four of the world's seven species of sea turtles: leatherbacks, hawksbills, green turtles and olive ridleys (all endangered). In 1993 the United Nations declared San Ignacio Lagoon a World Heritage site because of its importance to the world community.
