= Ojo de Liebre Lagoon =

Coastal lagoon in Baja California Sur, Mexico

Coordinates: 27°45′N 114°15′W

Designations

Ramsar Wetland
- Official name: Laguna Ojo de Liebre
- Designated: 2 February 2004
- Reference no.: 1339

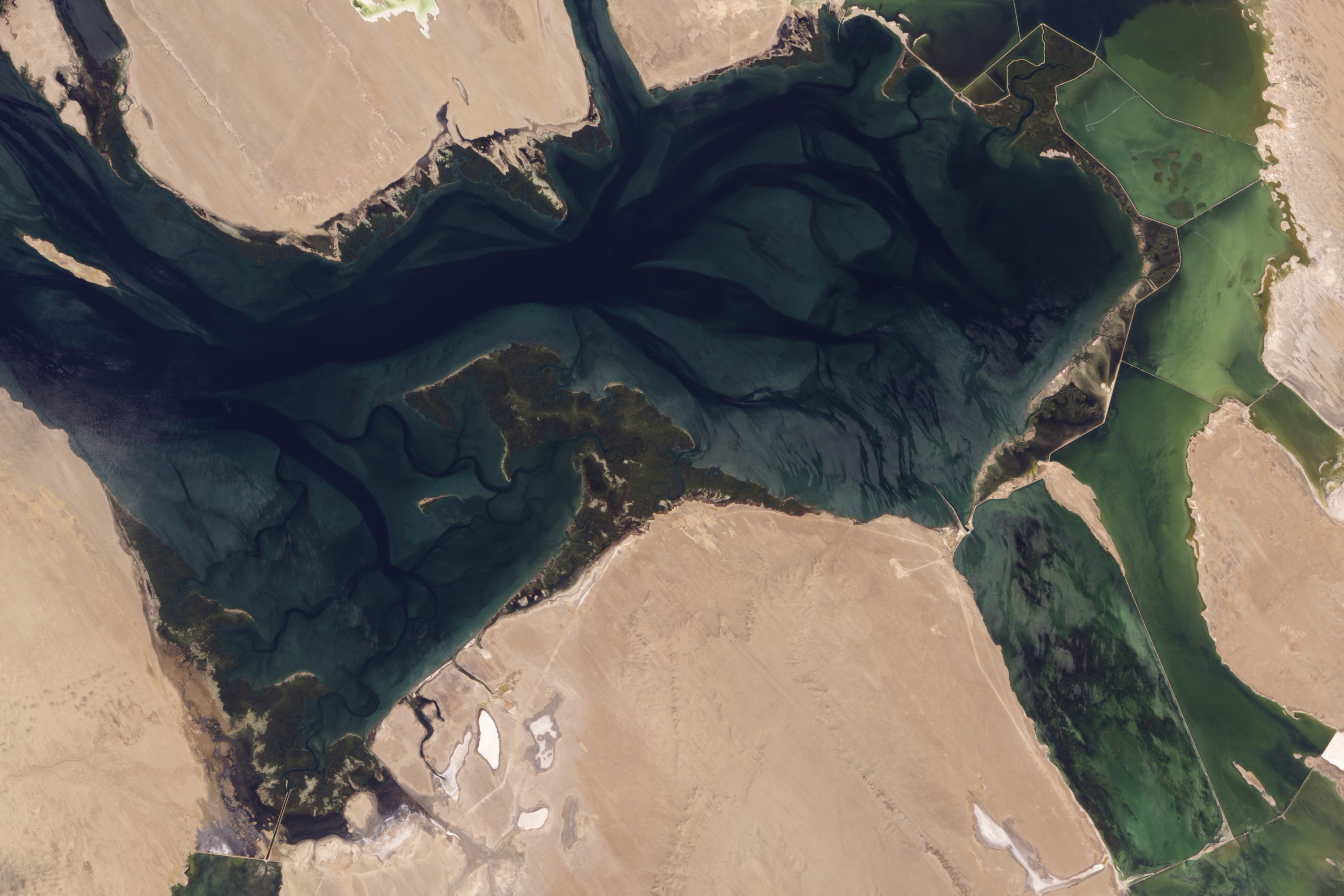
Laguna Ojo de Liebre, Mexico. Rectangle at lower right is a salt evaporation pond.

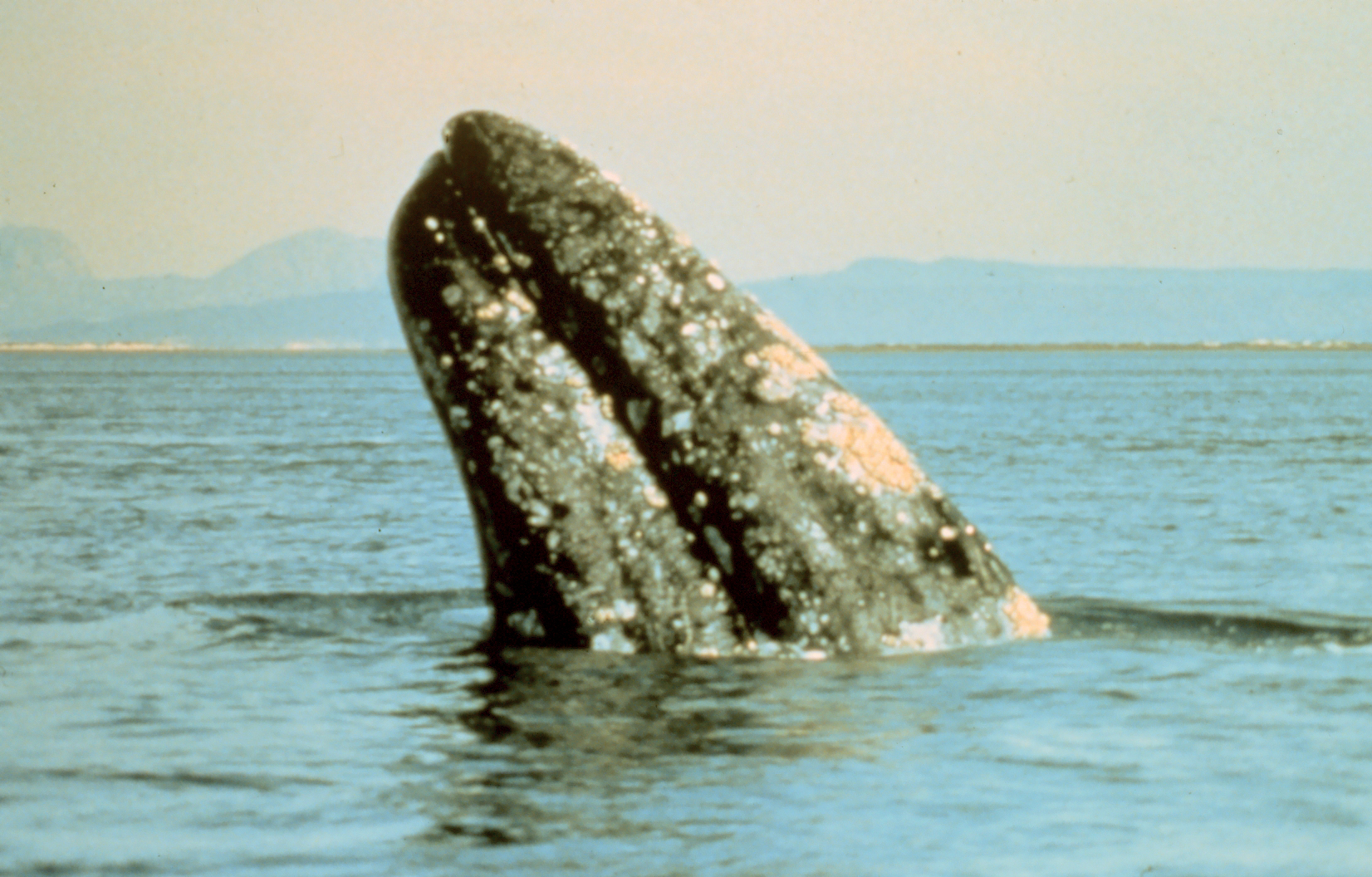
Gray whale (Eschrichtius robustus) at Laguna Ojo de Liebre

Ojo de Liebre Lagoon (transl. "hare eye lagoon"; also known as Scammon's Lagoon) is a coastal lagoon located in Mulegé Municipality near the town of Guerrero Negro in the northwestern part of Baja California Sur in Mexico. It lies approximately halfway between the southern tip of the Baja California Peninsula and the U.S.-Mexico border, opening into the Pacific Ocean.

The lagoon is within the Vizcaíno Biosphere Reserve UNESCO World Heritage Site, and is a Ramsar wetlands site. It also is the site of the biggest commercial saltworks plant in the world. It is an important habitat for reproducing and wintering gray whales and harbor seals, as well as other marine mammals including the California sea lion, northern elephant seal and blue whale. Four species of endangered marine turtles reproduce there. It is an important refuge for waterfowl in the winter. Tourism, now closely controlled, was formerly a threat to the gray whales.

== Geography ==
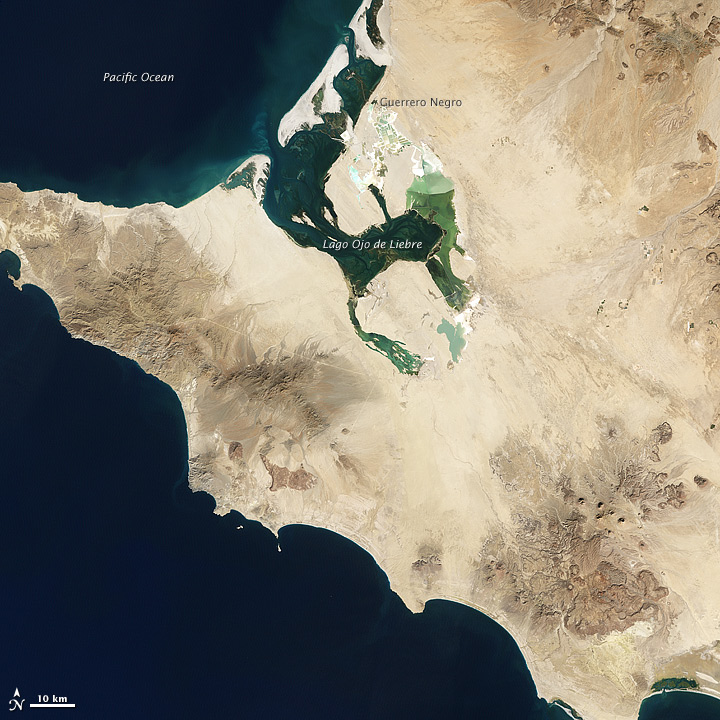
The lake and surroundings

Laguna Ojo de Liebre is a large, shallow salty watery habitat that is 9 kilometres (5.6 mi) wide, 4 kilometres (2.5 mi) long and from 5–12 metres (16–39 ft) in depth. Relatively deep channels cut through the lagoon between its broad intertidal flats. The climate is dry and warm; the annual temperature ranges from 18 °C and 22 °C. Annual rainfall can vary from none to 200 mm. The lagoon is surrounded by coastal dunes ranging from 12–15 metres (39–49 ft) in height, which support an unstable community of vegetation, and sandy beaches, some of them with shoals.

=== Geology ===
Geological studies indicated that Laguna Ojo de Liebre began as a pocket beach on the coastal plain of Baja California at a time when the ocean was some 12 meters lower than today's level. Tidal changes resulted in the formation of inlets and sediment from nearby river gradually built a barrier to form the lagoon.

=== Salt works ===
Industrialization is leaving its mark on the lagoon and surrounding area. There is a rectangular evaporation pond for the harvesting of salt, some large salt flats, and other barriers and channels built to enclose and flood shallow brine pans on the eastern side of the lagoon (yellow-greenish in color in the picture at right ).

The Ojo de Liebre lagoon has the biggest saltworks plant in the world – Exportadora de Sal S.A. (ESSA). The company makes salt from seawater which is pumped into concentration ponds measuring 33,000 hectares. The salt plant creates an effluent called bittern (a liquor remaining after salt-boiling) that is discharged into the lagoon. In December 1997, 94 green turtles were found dead weeks after the company discharged bitterns into the lagoon. The bitterns were investigated for fluoride content and were found to contain over 100 mg per liter. ESSA had earlier claimed that the bitterns contained the same salts present as seawater, only more concentrated (20-fold). F^{−} was found to be 60.5 times higher than F^{−} in sea water.

== History ==
In December 1857, Charles Melville Scammon, in the brig Boston, accompanied by the schooner-tender Marin, under Lefft, first entered Laguna Ojo de Liebre to hunt the gray whales breeding there. They caught twenty. Scammon returned to the lagoon the next winter (1858–59), this time with the bark Ocean Bird and the schooner-tenders A.M. Simpson and Kate, under Easton and Hale. He caught forty-seven cows, which produced 1,700 barrels (270 m^{3}) of oil. He was accompanied by six other vessels (five barks and one schooner), which obtained an additional 5,300 barrels (840 m^{3}) of oil (about 150 whales). A high of eleven vessels visited the lagoon in the winter of 1859-60, but they obtained considerably less oil—4,970 barrels (790 m^{3}) (c. 140 whales). Eight vessels (all sent by U.S. merchants, except one: the Russian brig Constantine, under Otto Wilhelm Lindholm) the next season got even less: a little over 3,300 barrels (520 m^{3}) from about 90 whales. Only a few ships visited the lagoon the following three seasons—in the first season they obtained 1,900 barrels (300 m^{3}); the second 1,200 barrels (190 m^{3}); and in the third only about 250 barrels (40 m^{3}). When the bark Louisa visited the lagoon in the winter of 1872-73 she only obtained 70 barrels (11 m^{3}) of oil. It was abandoned after that.

== See also ==
- Natural history of Baja California Sur
- Ramsar sites in Mexico
